= Elizabethan era =

Epoch in English history (1558–1603)

- 1558–1603
Tudor period	Jacobean era
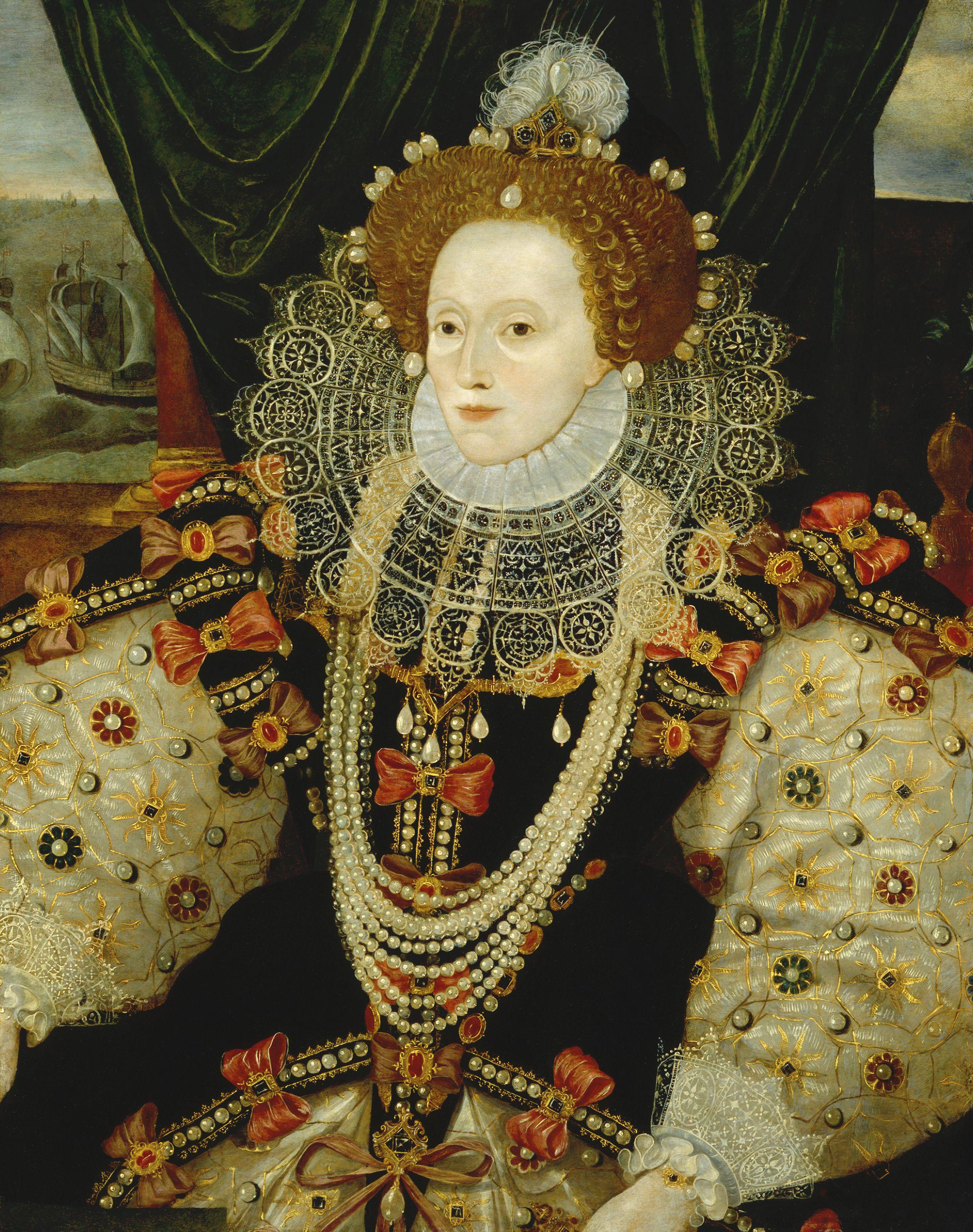
- Monarch: Elizabeth I
- Leaders: Elizabeth I; William Cecil, 1st Baron Burghley; Thomas Radclyffe, 3rd Earl of Sussex; Francis Walsingham; Robert Dudley, 1st Earl of Leicester; Francis Knollys the Elder; See others at List of ministers to Queen Elizabeth I.

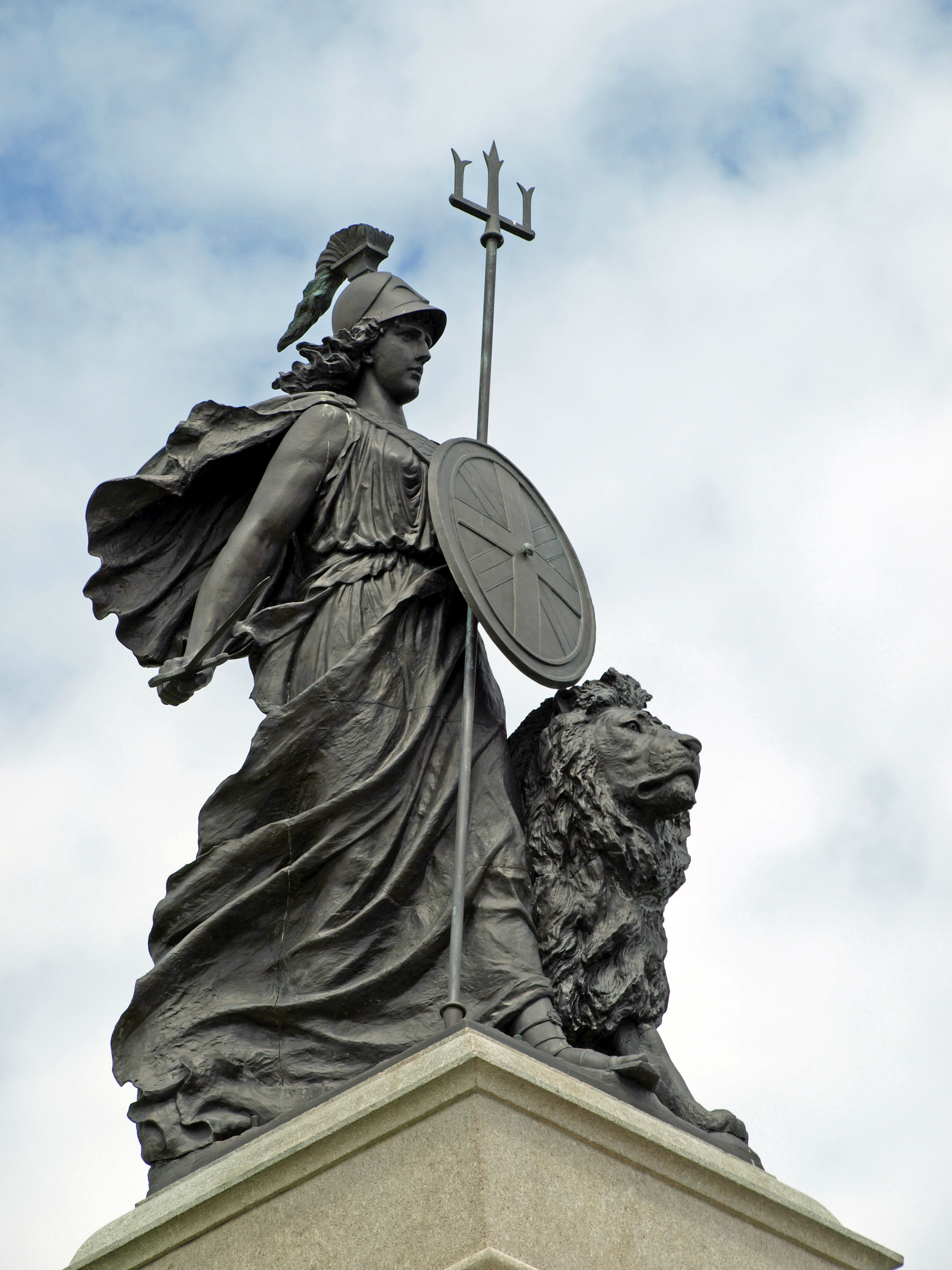
The National Armada memorial in Plymouth using the Britannia image to celebrate the defeat of the Spanish Armada in 1588 (William Charles May, sculptor, 1888)

The Elizabethan era is the epoch in the Tudor period of the history of England during the reign of Queen Elizabeth I (1558–1603). Historians often depict it as a golden age in English history, with an effective government, resulting from the reforms of Henry VII and Henry VIII, and a prospering economy boosted by trans-Atlantic trade and privateering. During this period, the Protestant Reformation became more popular among the people, and it was the last period in English history before the royal union with Scotland. England also began to engage in international exploration and expansion. Culturally, this period represented the apogee of the English Renaissance, and it saw a flowering of poetry, music, literature, and especially theatre, with playwrights such as William Shakespeare breaking new ground.

The Elizabethan era contrasts sharply with the previous and following reigns. It was a brief period of internal peace between the previous century's Wars of the Roses, the English Reformation, and religious battles between Protestants and Catholics, and the later conflict of the English Civil War and the political battles between Parliament and the monarchy that engulfed the remainder of the seventeenth century. Under Elizabeth, the religious conflict was settled for a time by the Elizabethan Religious Settlement, and Parliament was not yet strong enough to challenge royal absolutism.

During this time, England was well-off compared to the other nations of Europe. The Italian Renaissance had come to an end following the end of the Italian Wars, which left the Italian Peninsula impoverished. The Kingdom of France was embroiled in the French Wars of Religion (1562–1598), and the centuries-long Anglo-French Wars were largely suspended for most of Elizabeth's reign.

England's major rival during this time was Habsburg Spain. Their clashes in Europe and the Americas exploded into the undeclared Anglo-Spanish War of 1585–1604. A 1588 attempt by Philip II of Spain to invade England with the Spanish Armada was famously defeated.

== Government ==
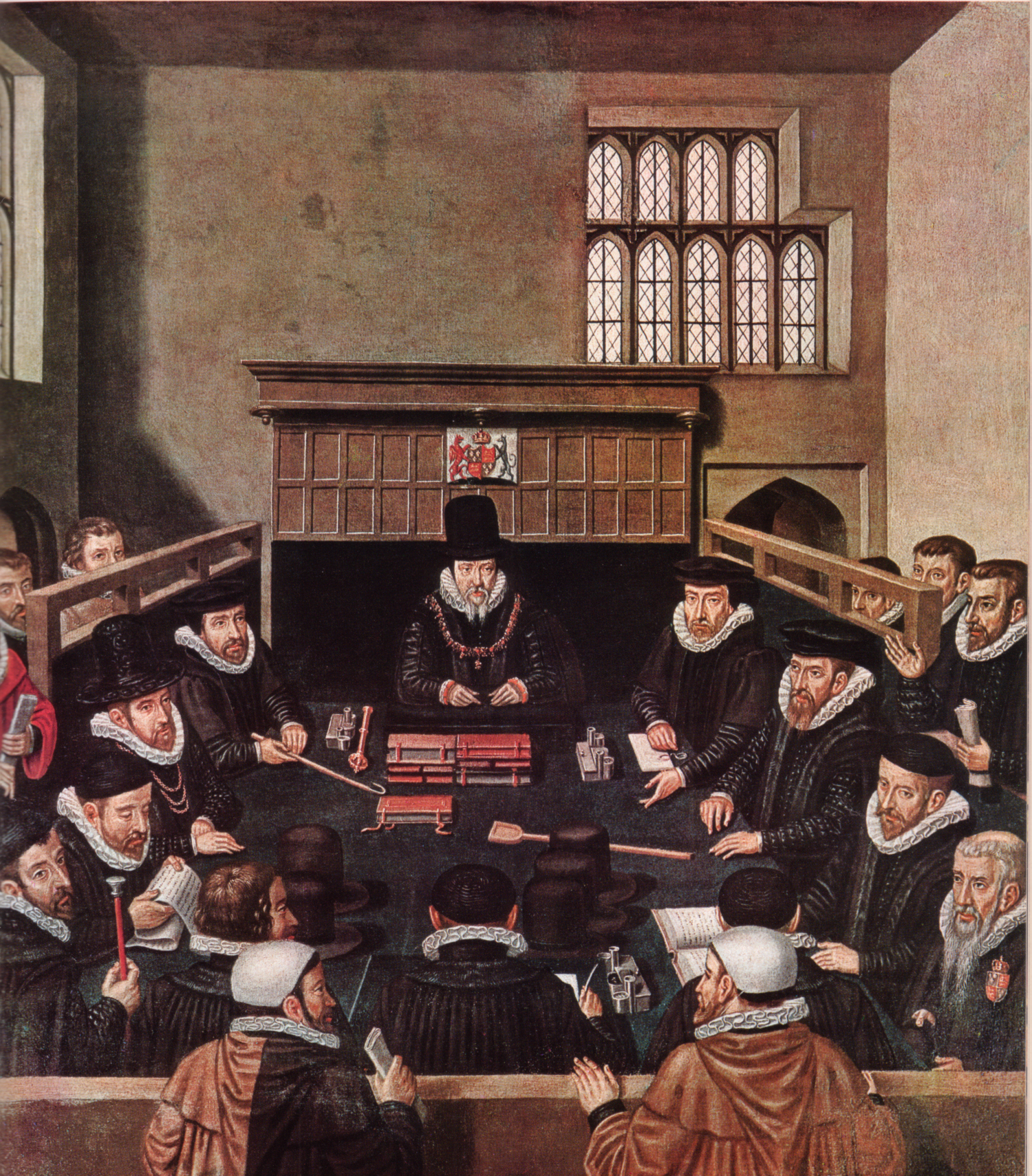
William Cecil presiding over the Court of Wards

Elizabethan England was not particularly successful in a military sense during the period, but it avoided major defeats and built up a powerful navy. On balance, it can be said that Elizabeth provided the country with a long period of general if not total peace and generally increased prosperity, due in large part to raiding Spanish treasure ships, raiding settlements with low defences, and selling African slaves. Having inherited a virtually bankrupt state from previous reigns, her frugal policies restored fiscal responsibility. Her fiscal restraint cleared the regime of debt by 1574, and ten years later the Crown enjoyed a surplus of £300,000 (equivalent to ~£114M in 2026). Economically, Sir Thomas Gresham's founding of the Royal Exchange (1565), the first stock exchange in England and one of the earliest in Europe, proved to be a crucial development for the economic development of England and soon for the world as a whole. With taxes lower than other European countries of the period, the English economy expanded; though wealth inequality was extreme, there was more wealth to go around at the end of Elizabeth's reign than at the beginning. This general peace and prosperity allowed the attractive developments that "Golden Age" advocates have stressed.

=== Plots, intrigues, and conspiracies ===
The Elizabethan Age was also an age of plots and conspiracies, frequently political, and often involving the highest levels of Elizabethan society. High officials in Madrid, Paris, and Rome sought to kill Elizabeth, a Protestant, and replace her with Mary, Queen of Scots, a Catholic. That would be a prelude to the religious recovery of England for Catholicism. In 1570, the Ridolfi plot was thwarted. In 1584, the Throckmorton Plot was discovered, after Francis Throckmorton confessed his involvement in a plot to overthrow the Queen and restore the Catholic Church in England. Another major conspiracy was the Babington Plot – the event which most directly led to Mary's execution, the discovery of which involved a double agent, Gilbert Gifford, acting under the direction of Francis Walsingham, the Queen's highly effective spy master.

The Essex Rebellion of 1601 had a dramatic element, as just before the uprising, supporters of the Earl of Essex, among them Charles and Joscelyn Percy (younger brothers of the Earl of Northumberland), paid for a performance of Richard II at the Globe Theatre, apparently to stir public ill will towards the monarchy. It was reported at the trial of Essex by Chamberlain's Men actor Augustine Phillips, that the conspirators paid the company forty shillings "above the ordinary" (i. e., above their usual rate) to stage the play, which the players felt was too old and "out of use" to attract a large audience.

In the last decades of her reign, Elizabeth gave James VI of Scotland an annual annuity or subsidy which contributed to an "amity" or peace between England and Scotland. James's courtiers and diplomats maintained a "secret correspondence" with Elizabeth's ministers. It became clear that he would be her successor.

Plots continued in James’s reign. In the Bye Plot of 1603, two Catholic priests planned to kidnap King James and hold him in the Tower of London until he agreed to be more tolerant towards Catholics. Most dramatic was the 1605 Gunpowder Plot to blow up the House of Lords during the State Opening of Parliament. It was discovered in time with eight conspirators executed, including Guy Fawkes, who became an iconic traitor in English folklore.

=== English Navy and defeat of the Armada ===
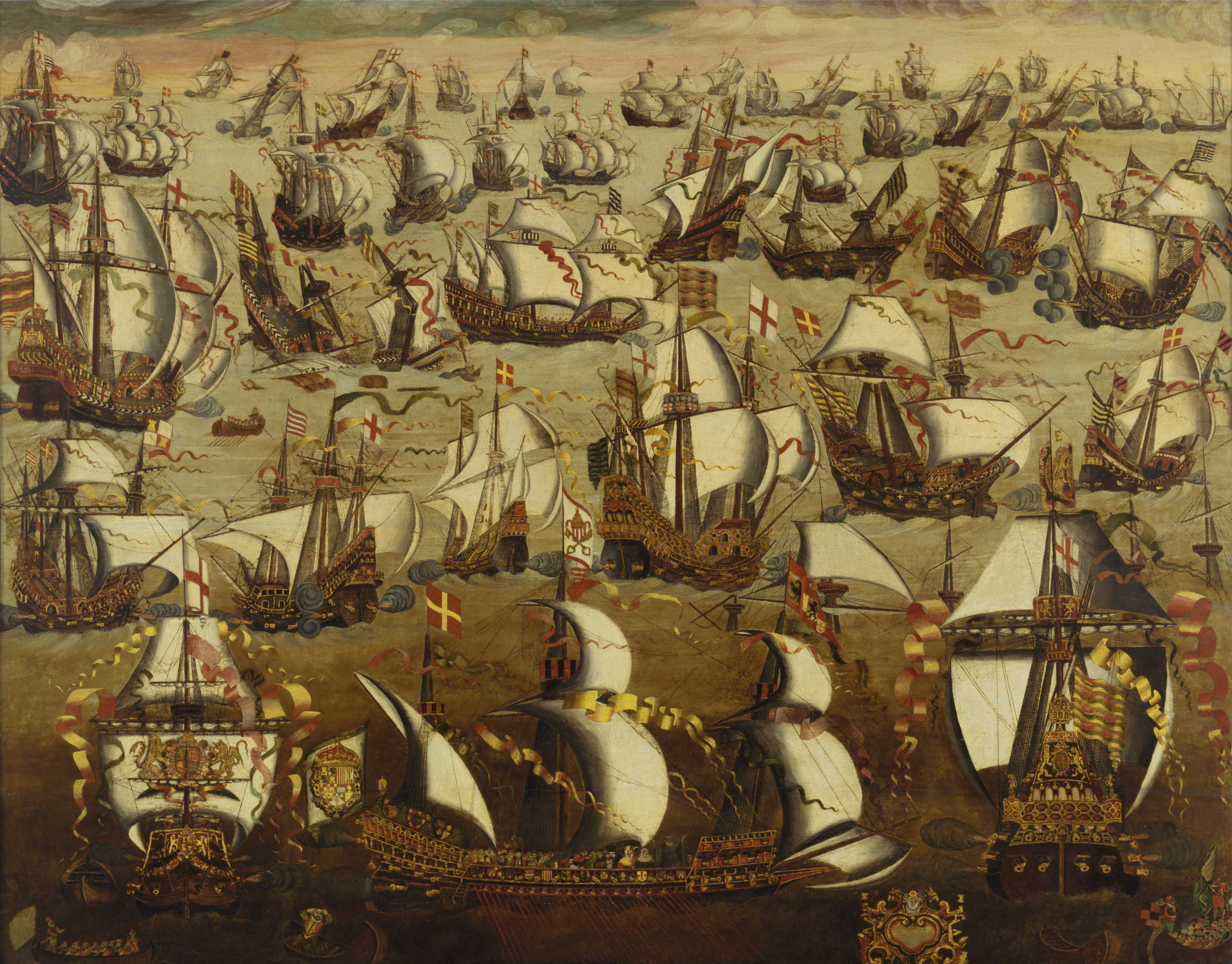
The Spanish Armada fighting the English navy at the Battle of Gravelines in 1588

While Henry VIII had launched the Royal Navy, Edward and Mary had ignored it and it was little more than a system of coastal defence. Elizabeth made naval strength a high priority. She risked war with Spain by supporting the "Elizabethan Sea Dogs", a group of privateers including John Hawkins and Francis Drake, who preyed on the Spanish merchant ships carrying gold and silver from the New World. The Navy yards were leaders in technical innovation, and the captains devised new tactics. Parker (1996) argues that the full-rigged ship was one of the greatest technological advances of the century and permanently transformed naval warfare. In 1573, English shipwrights introduced designs, first demonstrated in the "Dreadnaught", that allowed the ships to sail faster and maneuver better and permitted heavier guns. Whereas in the past, warships had tried to grapple with each other so soldiers could board the enemy ship, they now stood off and fired broadsides that would sink the enemy vessel without ship contact. When Spain finally decided to invade and conquer England, superior English ships and seamanship foiled the invasion and led to the destruction of the Spanish Armada in 1588, marking a high point of Elizabeth's reign. Technically, the Armada failed because Spain's over-complex strategy required coordination between the invasion fleet and the Spanish army on shore. Moreover, the poor design of the Spanish cannons meant they were much slower in reloading in close-range combat. Spain and France still had stronger fleets, but England was approaching their strength.

Parker has speculated on the dire consequences if the Spanish had landed their invasion army in 1588. He argues that the Spanish army was larger, more experienced, better equipped, more confident, and had better financing. The English defences, on the other hand, were thin and outdated; England had too few soldiers and they were at best only partially trained. Spain had chosen England's weakest link and probably could have captured London in a week. Parker adds that a Catholic uprising in the north and in Ireland could have brought total defeat.

The following year, England launched an equally unsuccessful expedition to Spain with the Drake–Norris Expedition. The advantage England had won upon the destruction of the Spanish Armada was lost, and this would mark a revival of Spanish naval power. A second English armada sent in 1596 succeeded in capturing and sacking Cádiz, and was one of the most signal English victories of the war. Further Spanish Armadas also failed - in 1596, 1597 and 1601. The war ended with the Treaty of London a year after Elizabeth’s death.

=== Colonising the New World ===
The discoveries of Christopher Columbus electrified all of Western Europe, especially maritime powers like England. King Henry VII commissioned John Cabot to lead a voyage to find a northern route to the Spice Islands of Asia; this began the search for the Northwest Passage. Cabot sailed in 1497 and reached Newfoundland. He led another voyage to the Americas the following year, but nothing was heard of him or his ships again.

In 1562 Elizabeth sent privateers also named 'Elizabethan Sea Dogs'; these included the likes of Hawkins and Drake to seize booty from Spanish and Portuguese ships off the coast of West Africa. When the Anglo-Spanish Wars intensified after 1585, Elizabeth approved further raids against Spanish ports in the Americas and shipping returning to Europe with treasure. Meanwhile, the influential writers Richard Hakluyt and John Dee were beginning to press for the establishment of England's own overseas empire. Spain was well established in the Americas, while Portugal, in union with Spain from 1580, had an ambitious global empire in Africa, Asia, and South America. France was exploring North America. England was stimulated to create its own colonies, with an emphasis on the West Indies rather than in North America.

Martin Frobisher landed at Frobisher Bay on Baffin Island in August 1576; He returned in 1577, claiming it in Queen Elizabeth's name, and a third voyage tried but failed to find a settlement in Frobisher Bay.

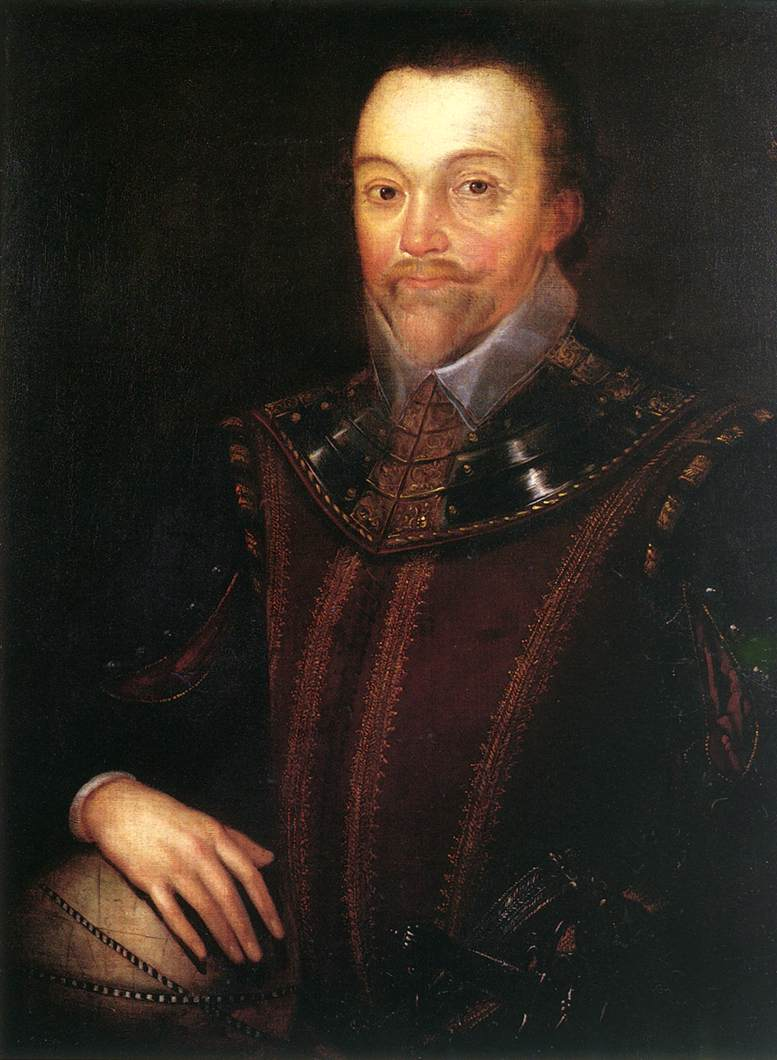
Francis Drake

From 1577 to 1580, Francis Drake circumnavigated the globe. Combined with his daring raids against the Spanish and his great victory over them at Cádiz in 1587, he became a famous hero—his exploits are still celebrated—but England did not follow up on his claims. In 1583, Humphrey Gilbert sailed to Newfoundland, taking possession of the harbour of St. John's together with all land within two hundred leagues to the north and south of it.

In 1584, the queen granted Walter Raleigh a charter for the colonisation of Virginia; it was named in her honour. Raleigh and Elizabeth sought both immediate riches and a base for privateers to raid the Spanish treasure fleets. Raleigh sent others to found the Roanoke Colony; it remains a mystery why the settlers all disappeared. In 1600, the queen chartered the East India Company in an attempt to break the Spanish and Portuguese monopoly of far Eastern trade. It established trading posts, which in later centuries evolved into British India, on the coasts of what is now India and Bangladesh. Larger scale colonisation to North America began shortly after Elizabeth's death.

== Distinctions ==
England in this era had some positive aspects that set it apart from contemporaneous continental European societies. Torture was rare, since the English legal system reserved torture only for capital crimes like treason—though forms of corporal punishment, some of them extreme, were practised. The persecution of witches began in 1563, and hundreds of women were executed, although this was still mild compared to the persecution of witches on the European Continent. Mary had tried her hand at an aggressive anti-Protestant Inquisition and was hated for it; such religious persecution was not to be repeated. Nevertheless, more Catholics were persecuted, exiled, and burned alive under Elizabeth than Protestants were under Mary.

== Religion ==
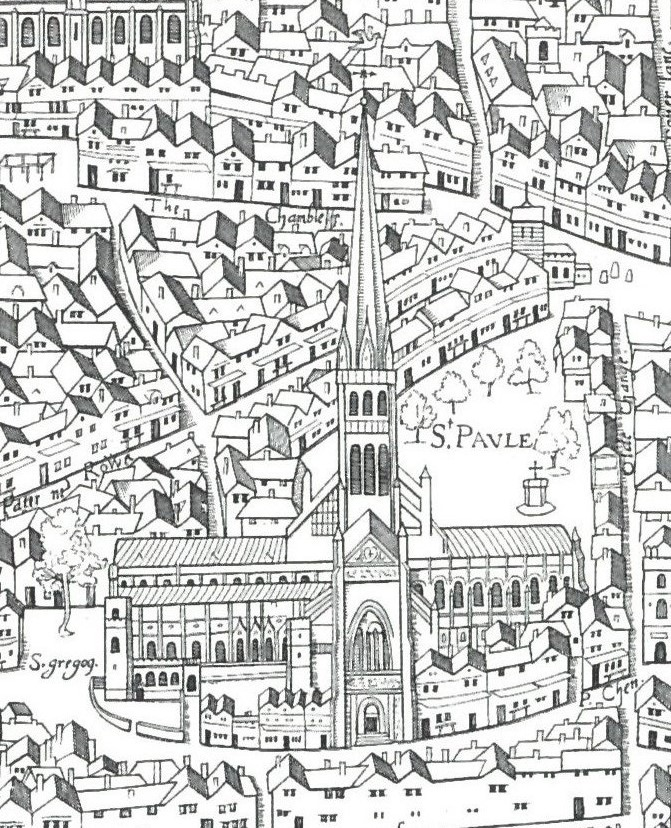
Detail from the Copperplate map of London (1553–1559), showing St Paul's Cathedral

Elizabeth managed to moderate and quell the intense religious passions of the time. This was in significant contrast to previous and succeeding eras of marked religious violence in England.

Elizabeth said "I have no desire to make windows into men's souls". Her desire to moderate the religious persecutions of previous Tudor reigns – the persecution of Catholics under Edward VI, and of Protestants under Mary I – appears to have had a moderating effect on English society. Elizabeth, an undogmatic Protestant, authorized the 1559 Book of Common Prayer which effectively reinstated the 1552 Book of Common Prayer with modifications which made clear that the Church of England believed in the (spiritual) Real Presence of Christ in the Holy Communion but without a clear definition of how, in favour of leaving this a mystery. She also had the Black Rubric removed from the Articles of Faith: this had allowed kneeling to receive Communion without implying that by doing so it meant the real and essential presence of Christ in the bread and wine: she believed it so. She was not able to get an unmarried clergy or the Protestant Holy Communion celebrated to look like a Mass. The Apostolic Succession was maintained, the institution of the church continued without a break (with 98% of the clergy remaining at their posts), and the attempt to ban music in church was defeated. The Injunctions of 1571 forbade any doctrines that did not conform to the teachings of the Church Fathers and the Catholic Bishops. The Queen's hostility to strict Calvinistic doctrines blocked the Radicals.

Almost no original theological thought came out of the English Reformation; instead, the Church relied on the Catholic Consensus of the first four Ecumenical Councils. The preservation of many Catholic doctrines and practices was the cuckoo's nest that eventually resulted in the formation of the Via Media during the 17th century. Elizabeth spent the rest of her reign ferociously fending off radical reformers and Roman Catholics who wanted to modify the Settlement of Church affairs: The Church of England was Protestant, "with its peculiar arrested development in Protestant terms, and the ghost which it harboured of an older world of Catholic traditions and devotional practice".

For several years, Elizabeth refrained from persecuting Catholics because she was against Catholicism, not her Catholic subjects if they made no trouble. In 1570, Pope Pius V excommunicated Elizabeth, declaring her a heretic who was not a legitimate queen, and that her subjects no longer owed her obedience. The pope sent Jesuits and seminarians to secretly evangelize and support Catholics. After several plots to overthrow her, Elizabeth began to consider most Catholic clergy to be traitors, and she pursued them aggressively in England. Priests were often tortured or executed after capture unless they cooperated with the English authorities. People who publicly supported Catholicism were excluded from the professions; they were also sometimes fined or imprisoned. This was justified because Catholics were not persecuted for their religion but punished for being traitors who supported the Queen's Spanish foe; in practice, however, Catholics perceived it as religious persecution and regarded those executed as martyrs.

== Science, technology, and exploration ==
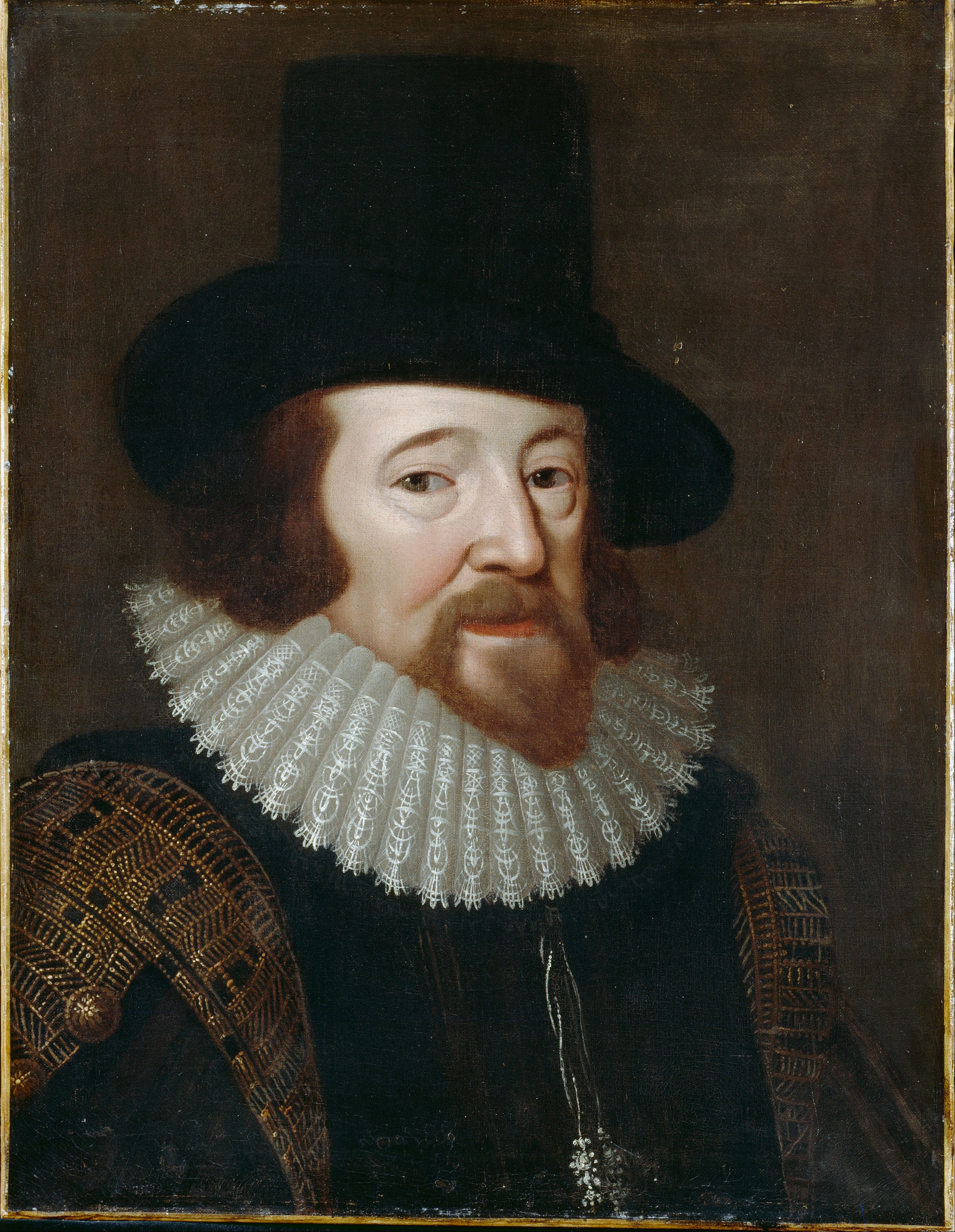
Francis Bacon, pioneer of modern scientific thought

Lacking a dominant genius or a formal structure for scientific research (the following century had both Sir Isaac Newton and the Royal Society), the Elizabethan era nonetheless saw significant scientific progress. The astronomers Thomas Digges and Thomas Harriot made important contributions; William Gilbert published his seminal study of magnetism, De Magnete, in 1600. Substantial advancements were made in the fields of cartography and surveying. The court astronomer John Dee was also highly influential in Elizabethan science and politics.

Much of this scientific and technological progress was helped by the advancement of navigation. English exploration thrived in the Elizabethan era. Sir Francis Drake circumnavigated the globe between 1577 and 1581, and Martin Frobisher explored the Arctic. The first attempt at English settlement of the eastern seaboard of North America occurred in this era—the abortive colony at Roanoke Island in 1587.

While Elizabethan England is not thought of as an age of technological innovation, some progress did occur. In 1564, Guilliam Boonen came from the Netherlands to be Queen Elizabeth's first coach-builder, thus introducing the new European invention of the spring-suspension coach to England as a replacement for the litters and carts of the past. Coaches quickly became as fashionable as sports cars in a later century; social critics, especially Puritan commentators, noted the "diverse great ladies" who rode "up and down the countryside" in their new coaches.

== Social history ==
Historians since the 1960s have explored many facets of the social history of the Elizabethan era, covering every class of the population.

=== Health ===
Although home to only a small part of the population at the time, Tudor cities, including during the Elizabethan era, were overcrowded and unhygienic. Most towns had unpaved roads and very poor public sanitation. There were no sewers or drains, and rubbish was simply littered onto the streets. Pathogen-carrying animals, most notably rats, thrived in these conditions. In larger towns and cities, such as London, common diseases arising from lack of sanitation included smallpox, measles, malaria, typhus, diphtheria, scarlet fever, and chickenpox.

Outbreaks of the Black Death pandemic occurred in England in 1498, 1535, 1543, 1563, 1589 and 1603. The reason for the speedy spread of the disease was the increase of flea-infected rats carrying the disease.

Child mortality was low in comparison with earlier and later periods, at about 150 or fewer deaths per 1000 babies. Life expectancy at age 5 was about 50-65 years old.

=== Homes and dwelling ===
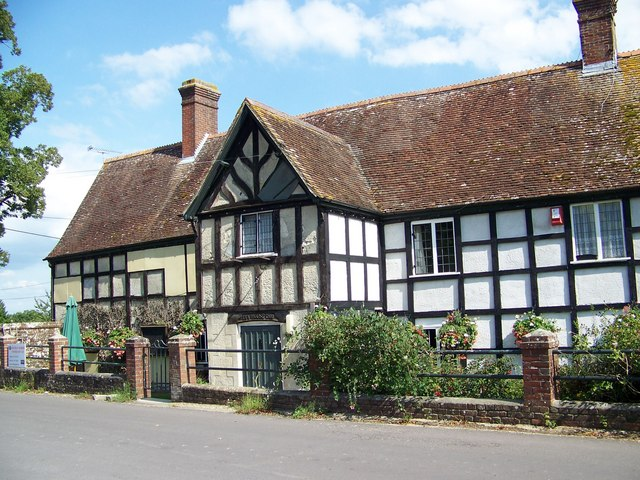
Parts of the Ivy House in Witchampton date from c. 1580

During the Elizabethan era, the vast majority of the English people were tenant farmers who lived in small villages. Their homes were, as in earlier periods, thatched huts with one or two rooms, although later on during this period, roofs were also tiled. Furniture was basic, with stools being commonplace rather than chairs. The walls of Tudor houses were often made from timber and wattle and daub, or brick; stone and tiles were more common in the wealthier homes. The daub was usually then painted with limewash, making it white, and the wood was painted with black tar to prevent rotting, but not in Tudor times; the Victorians did this afterward. The bricks were handmade and thinner than modern bricks. The wooden beams were cut by hand, which makes telling the difference between Tudor houses and Tudor-style houses easy, as the original beams are not straight. The upper floors of Tudor houses were often larger than the ground floors, which would create an overhang (or jetty). This would create more floor surface above while also keeping maximum street width. During the Tudor period, the use of glass in house construction began, and later became widespread. Glass was very expensive and difficult to make at the time, so panes were made small and held together with a lead lattice, in casement windows. People who could not afford glass often used polished horn, cloth or paper. Tudor chimneys were tall, thin, and often decorated with symmetrical patterns of moulded or cut brick. Early Tudor houses, and the homes of poorer people, did not have chimneys. The smoke in these houses would be let out through a simple hole in the roof.

Mansions had many chimneys for the many fireplaces required to keep the vast rooms warm. These fires were also the only way of cooking food. Wealthy Tudor homes featured many rooms, where a large number of guests and servants could be accommodated, fed and entertained. Wealth was in part demonstrated by the extensive use of glass. Windows became a key feature of Tudor mansions, and were often a fashion statement. Mansions were often designed to a symmetrical plan; "E" and "H" shapes were popular.

=== Cities ===
The population of London increased from 100,000 to 200,000 between Elizabeth’s coronation in 1558 and her death in 1603. Inflation was rapid and wealth inequality was severe. Poor men, women, and children begged in the cities, and the children only earned about six pence (equivalent to ~£16-30 in 2026) a week. With the growth of industry, many landlords decided to use their land for manufacturing purposes, displacing the farmers who lived and worked there. Despite the struggles of the lower class, the government tended to spend more money on wars and exploration voyages than on welfare.

=== Poverty ===
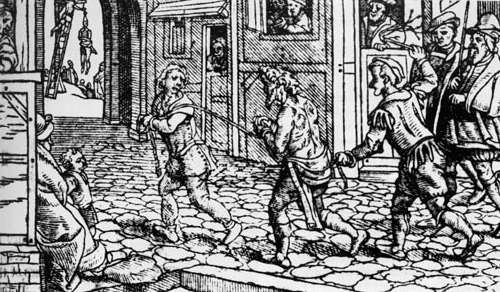
A woodcut of c. 1536 depicting a vagrant being punished in the streets in Tudor England

About one-third of the population in Elizabethan England lived in poverty, with the wealthy expected to give alms to assist the impotent poor. Tudor law was harsh on the able-bodied poor, i.e., those unable to find work. Those who left their parishes in order to locate work were termed vagabonds and could be subjected to punishments, including whipping and putting on the stocks.

The idea of the workhouse for the able-bodied poor was first suggested in 1576.

=== Education ===
There was an unprecedented expansion of education in the Tudor period. Until then, few children went to school. Those that did go were mainly the sons of wealthy or ambitious fathers who could afford to pay the tuition fee. Boys were allowed to go to school and began at the age of 4; they then moved to grammar school when they were seven years old. Girls were either kept at home by their parents to help with housework or sent out to work to bring money in for the family. They were not sent to school. Boys were educated for work; girls were prepared for marriage and maintaining a household. Wealthy families often hired tutors to teach their boys at home. Many Tudor towns and villages had a parish school where the local vicar taught boys to read and write. Brothers sometimes taught their sisters these skills. At school, pupils were taught English, Latin, Greek, catechism, and arithmetic. The pupils practised writing in ink by copying the alphabet and the Lord's Prayer. There were few books, so pupils read from hornbooks instead. These wooden boards had the alphabet, prayers, or other writings pinned to them and were covered with a thin layer of transparent cow's horn. There were two types of school in Tudor times: petty school was where young boys were taught to read and write; grammar school was where abler boys were taught English and Latin. It was usual for students to attend six days a week. The school day started at 7:00 a.m. in winter and 6:00 a.m. in summer and finished at about 5:00 p.m. Petty schools had shorter hours, mostly to allow poorer boys the opportunity to work as well. Schools were harsh and teachers were very strict, often beating pupils who misbehaved.

Education would begin at home, where children were taught the basic etiquette of proper manners and respecting others. It was necessary for boys to attend grammar school, but girls were rarely allowed in any place of education other than petty schools, and then only with a restricted curriculum. Petty schools were for all children aged from 5 to 7 years of age. Only the wealthiest people allowed their daughters to be taught, and only at home. During this time, endowed schooling became available. This meant that even boys of very poor families were able to attend school if they were not needed to work at home, but only in a few localities were funds available to provide support as well as the necessary education scholarships.

Boys from wealthy families were often taught at home by a private tutor. When Henry VIII shut the monasteries, he closed their schools. He later refounded many former monastic schools; they are known as "King's schools" and are found all over England. During the reign of Edward VI, many free grammar schools were set up to take in non-fee paying students. There were two universities in Tudor England: Oxford and Cambridge. Some boys went to university at the age of about 14.

=== Food ===
==== Availability ====
England's food supply was plentiful throughout most of Elizabeth’s reign; there were no nationwide famines. Bad harvests caused distress, but they were usually localized. The most widespread food shortages came in 1555–57 and 1596–98. In the towns the price of staples was fixed by law; in hard times the size of bread loaves sold by bakers was smaller.

Trade and industry flourished in the 16th century, making England more prosperous and improving the standard of living of the upper and middle classes. However, the lower classes did not benefit much from this increased prosperity, and frequently faced food insecurity. As the English population was fed by its own agricultural produce, a series of bad harvests in the 1590s caused widespread starvation and poverty. The success of the wool trading industry decreased attention on agriculture, resulting in further starvation of the lower classes. Cumbria, the poorest and most isolated part of England, suffered a six-year famine beginning in 1594. Diseases and natural disasters also contributed to the scarce food supply.

In the 17th century, the food supply improved. England had no food crises from 1650 to 1725, a period when France was unusually vulnerable to famines. Historians note that oat and barley prices in England did not always increase following a failure of the wheat crop, but these prices did do so in France.

England was exposed to new foods (such as the potato imported from South America), and developed new tastes during the era. The more prosperous enjoyed a wide variety of food and drink, including exotic new drinks such as tea, coffee, and chocolate. French and Italian chefs appeared in the country houses and palaces, bringing new standards of food preparation and taste. For example, the English developed a taste for acidic foods—such as oranges for the upper class—and started to use vinegar heavily. The gentry paid increasing attention to their gardens, with new fruits, vegetables and herbs; pasta, pastries, and dried mustard balls first appeared on the table. The apricot was a special treat at fancy banquets. Roast beef remained a staple for those who could afford it. The majority of the English people subsisted mainly on bread and fish. Every social class had a taste for beer and rum.

==== Diet ====
The diet in England during the Elizabethan era depended largely on social class. Bread was a staple of the Elizabethan diet, and people of different statuses ate bread of different qualities. The upper classes ate fine white bread called manchet, while the poor ate coarse bread made of barley or rye.

===== Diet of the lower class =====
The poorer among the population consumed a diet largely of bread, cheese, milk, and beer, with small portions of meat, fish and vegetables, and occasionally some fruit. Potatoes were just arriving at the end of the period, and became increasingly central to the English diet. A typical poor farmer would sell his best products on the market, keeping the cheaper food for the family. Stale bread could be used to make bread pudding, and bread crumbs served to thicken soups, stews, and sauces.

===== Diet of the middle class =====
At a somewhat higher social level families ate an enormous variety of meats, who could choose among venison, beef, mutton, veal, pork, fowl, salmon, eel, and shellfish. The holiday goose was a special treat. Rich spices were used by the wealthier people to offset the smells of old salt-preserved meat. Many rural folk and some townspeople tended small gardens which produced vegetables such as asparagus, cucumbers, spinach, lettuce, beans, cabbage, turnips, radishes, carrots, leeks, and peas, as well as medicinal and flavouring herbs.Some grew their own apricots, grapes, berries, apples, pears, plums, strawberries, currants, and cherries. Families without a garden could trade with their neighbours to obtain vegetables and fruits at low cost. Fruits and vegetables were used in desserts such as pastries, tarts, cakes, crystallized fruit, and syrup.

===== Diet of the upper class =====
At the rich end of the scale, the manor houses and palaces were awash with large, elaborately prepared meals, usually for many people, and often accompanied by entertainment. The upper classes often celebrated religious festivals, weddings, alliances, and the whims of the king or queen. Feasts were commonly used to commemorate the "procession" of the crowned heads of state in the summer months, when the king or queen would travel through a circuit of other nobles' lands both to avoid the plague season of London and to alleviate the royal coffers, often drained through the winter to provide for the needs of the royal family and court. This would include a few days or even a week of feasting in each noble's home, who depending on his or her production and display of fashion, generosity and entertainment, could have his way made in court and elevate his or her status for months or even years.

Among the rich, private hospitality was an important item in the budget. Entertaining a royal party for a few weeks could be ruinous to a nobleman. Inns existed for travellers, but restaurants were not known.

Special courses after a feast or dinner which often involved a special room or outdoor gazebo (sometimes known as a folly), with a central table set with dainties of "medicinal" value to help with digestion. These would include wafers, comfits of sugar-spun anise or other spices, jellies and marmalades (a firmer variety than modern marmalades, these would be more similar to modern gelatin jigglers), candied fruits, spiced nuts, and other such niceties. These would be eaten while standing and drinking warm, spiced wines (known as hypocras) or other drinks known to aid in digestion. Sugar in the Middle Ages and early modern period was often considered medicinal, and used heavily in such food and drink. This was not a course of pleasure, though it could be as everything was a treat, but one of healthful eating and abetting the digestive capabilities of the body. It also, of course, allowed those standing to display new clothes, and the holders of the dinner and banquet to show off the wealth of their estate, with having a special room for banqueting.

=== Gender ===
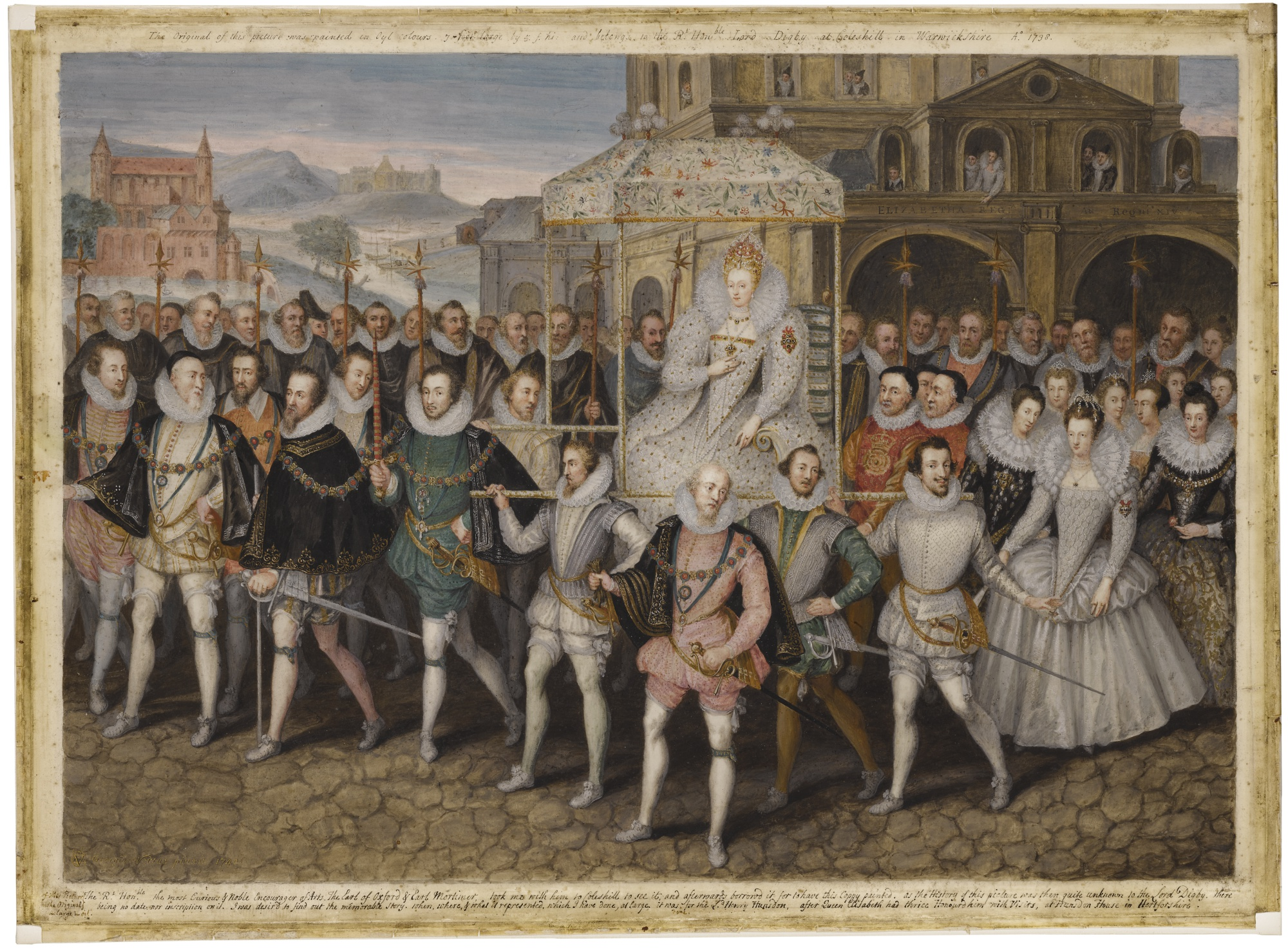
The Procession Picture, c. 1600, showing Elizabeth I borne along by her courtiers

While the Tudor era presents an abundance of material on English noble women—especially royal wives and queens—historians have recovered scant documentation about the lives of average English women. There has, however, been extensive statistical analysis of demographic and population data which includes women, especially in their childbearing roles. The role of women in society was, for that historical era, relatively unconstrained; Spanish and Italian visitors to England commented regularly, and sometimes caustically, on the freedom that women enjoyed in England, in contrast to their home cultures. England had more well-educated upper-class women than was common anywhere in Europe.

The Queen's marital status was a major political and diplomatic topic. It also entered into the popular culture. Elizabeth's unmarried status inspired a cult of virginity. In poetry and portraiture, she was depicted as a virgin or a goddess or both, not as a normal woman. Elizabeth made a virtue of her virginity: in 1559, she told the Commons, "And, in the end, this shall be for me sufficient, that a marble stone shall declare that a queen, having reigned such a time, lived and died a virgin". Public tributes to the Virgin by 1578 acted as a coded assertion of opposition to the queen's marriage negotiations with the Duc d'Alençon.

In contrast to her father's emphasis on masculinity and physical prowess, Elizabeth emphasized the maternalism theme, saying often that she was married to her kingdom and subjects. She explained "I keep the good will of all my husbands – my good people – for if they did not rest assured of some special love towards them, they would not readily yield me such good obedience", and promised in 1563 they would never have a more natural mother than she. Coch (1996) argues that her figurative motherhood played a central role in her complex self-representation, shaping and legitimating the personal rule of a divinely appointed female prince.

=== Marriage ===
Over 90% of English women (and adults, in general) entered marriage within their lifetimes at the end of the 1500s and beginning of the 1600s, at an average age of about 25–26 years for the bride and 27–28 years for the groom, with the most common ages being 25–26 for grooms (who would have finished their apprenticeships around this age) and 23 for brides. Among the nobility and gentry, the average was around 19–21 for brides and 24–26 for grooms. Many city and townswomen married for the first time in their thirties and forties, and it was not unusual for orphaned young women to delay marriage until the late twenties or early thirties to help support their younger siblings. Roughly a quarter of all English brides were pregnant at their weddings.

== High culture ==
=== Theatre ===
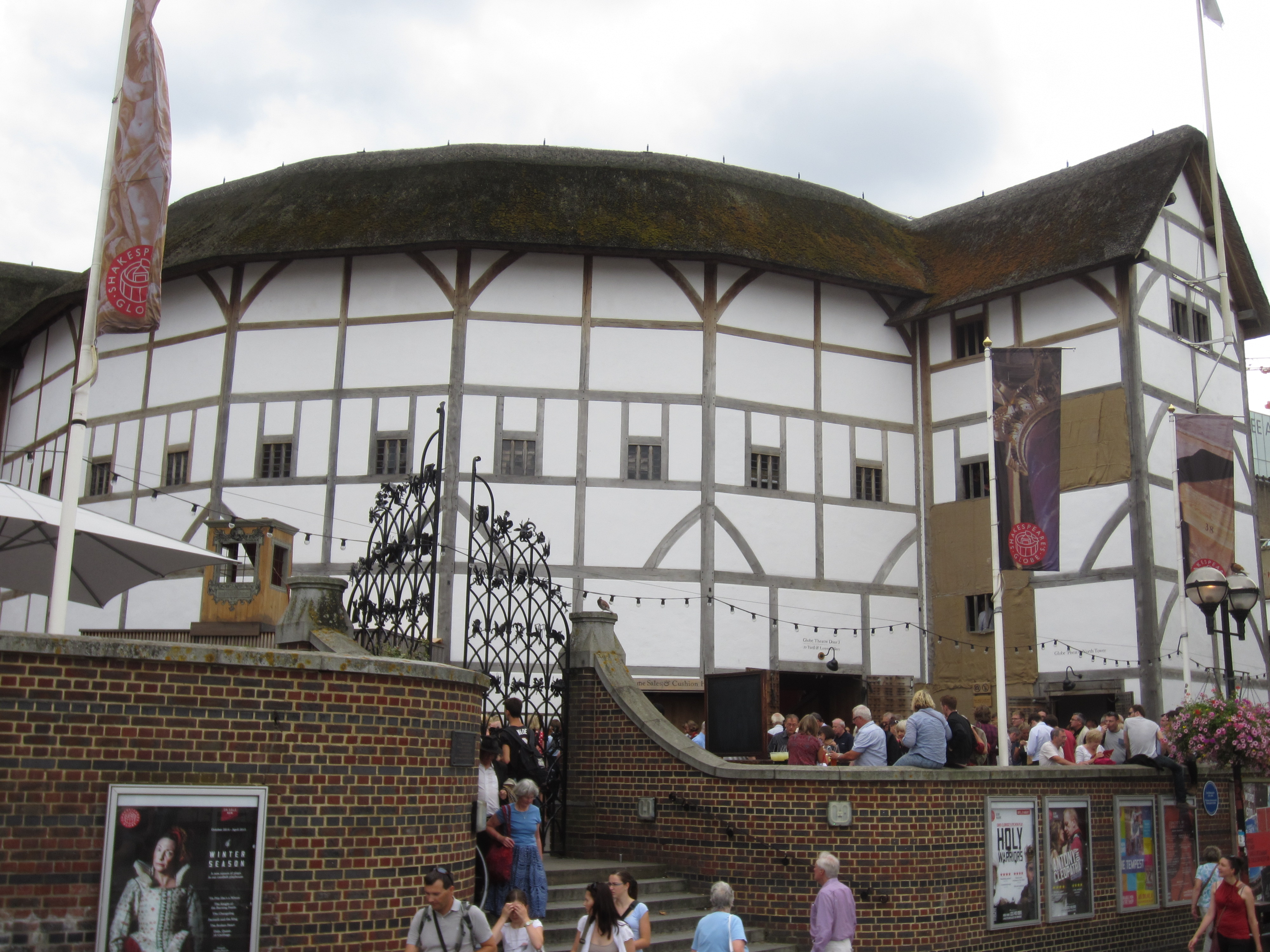
A reconstruction of the Globe Theatre in London, originally built in 1599 and used by Shakespeare

The high culture of the Elizabethan Renaissance was expressed in great part in its theatre. With William Shakespeare at his artistic peak, as well as the rise of Christopher Marlowe and many other playwrights, actors and theatres were constantly busy. Historical topics were especially popular, alongside the familiar comedies and tragedies.

=== Literature ===
Elizabethan literature is widely considered one of the "most splendid" in the history of English literature. In addition to drama and the theatre, it saw a flowering of poetry, with new forms like the sonnet, the Spenserian stanza, and dramatic blank verse, as well as prose, including historical chronicles, pamphlets, and the first English novels. Edmund Spenser, Richard Hooker, and John Lyly, as well as Marlowe and Shakespeare, were major Elizabethan writers.

=== Music ===
Travelling musicians were in great demand at court, in churches, at country houses, and at local festivals. Important composers of the time included William Byrd (1543–1623), John Dowland (1563–1626) Thomas Campion (1567–1620), and Robert Johnson (c. 1583–c. 1634). The composers were commissioned by churches and the royal court, and deployed two main styles, madrigal and ayre. The popular culture showed a strong interest in folk songs and ballads (folk songs that tell a story). It became fashionable in the late 19th century to collect and sing these folk songs.

=== Fine arts ===
It has often been said that the Renaissance came late to England, in contrast to Italy and the other states of continental Europe; the fine arts in England during the Tudor and Stuart eras were dominated by foreign and imported talent—from Hans Holbein the Younger under Henry VIII to Anthony van Dyck under Charles I. Yet within this general trend, a native school of painting was developing. In Elizabeth's reign, Nicholas Hilliard, the Queen's "limner and goldsmith", is the most widely recognized figure in this native development; but George Gower has begun to attract greater notice and appreciation as knowledge of him and his art and career has improved.

== Popular culture ==
=== Pastimes ===
The Annual Summer Fair and other seasonal fairs such as May Day, were often bawdy affairs.

Watching plays became very popular during the Tudor period. Most towns sponsored plays enacted in town squares followed by the actors using the courtyards of taverns or inns (referred to as inn-yards) followed by the first theatres (great open-air amphitheatres and then the introduction of indoor theatres called playhouses). This popularity was helped by the rise of great playwrights such as William Shakespeare and Christopher Marlowe using London theatres such as the Globe Theatre. By 1595, 15,000 people a week were watching plays in London. It was during Elizabeth's reign that the first real theatres were built in England. Before theatres were built, actors travelled from town to town and performed in the streets or outside inns.

Miracle plays were local re-enactments of stories from the Bible. They derived from the old custom of mystery plays, in which stories and fables were enacted to teach lessons or educate about life in general. These influenced Shakespeare.

Festivals were popular seasonal entertainments.

=== Sports ===
There were many different types of Elizabethan sports and entertainment. Animal sports included bear and bull baiting, dog fighting and cock fighting.

The rich enjoyed tennis, fencing, jousting, and running at the ring. Hunting was strictly limited to the upper class. They trained their packs of dogs and hounds to chase foxes, hares and boars. The rich also enjoyed hunting small game and birds with hawks, a sport known as falconry.

==== Jousting ====
Jousting was an upscale, very expensive sport, where warriors on horseback raced toward each other in full armour trying to use their lance to knock the other off his horse. It was a violent sport—King Henry II of France was killed in a tournament in 1559, as were many other figures in history. King Henry VIII was a champion; he finally retired from the lists after a hard fall left him unconscious for hours.

Other sports included archery, bowling, hammer-throwing, quarter-staff contests, troco, quoits, skittles, wrestling, and mob football.

==== Gambling and card games ====
Dice and card games were popular activities among all social classes. Card games appeared in Spain and Italy in about 1370, but they probably originated from Egypt. They began to spread throughout Europe and first appeared in England in around 1460. By the time of Elizabeth's reign, gambling was a common sport. The card suits tended to change over time. The first Italian and Spanish decks had the same suits: Swords, Batons/Clubs, Cups, and Coins. The suits often changed from country to country. England probably followed the Latin version, initially using cards imported from Spain but later relying on more convenient supplies from France. Most of the decks that have survived use the French Suit: Spades, Hearts, Clubs, and Diamonds. Before Elizabeth’s reign, the number of playing cards had already been standardized to 52 cards per deck. The lowest court subject in England was called the "knave". The lowest court card was therefore called the knave until sometime later when the term "Jack" became more common. Popular card games for small groups of players included Maw, One and Thirty, and Bone-ace. Ruff and Honours was a popular team game.

=== Festivals, holidays and celebrations ===
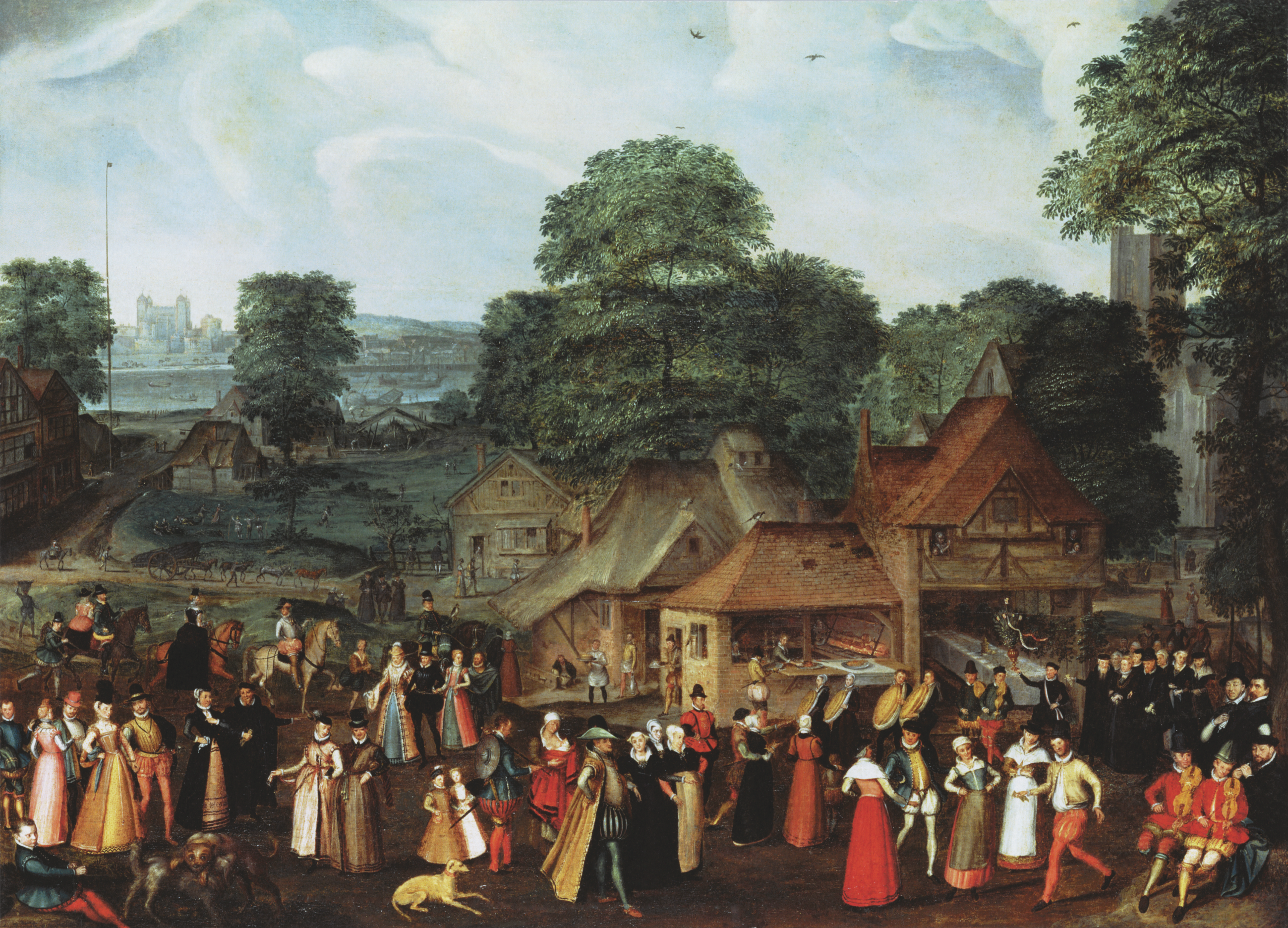
A wedding feast, c. 1569

During the Elizabethan era, people looked forward to holidays because opportunities for leisure were limited, with time away from hard work being restricted to periods after church on Sundays. For the most part, leisure and festivities took place on a public church holy day. Every month had its own holiday, some of which are listed below:

- The first Monday after Twelfth Night of January (any time between 7 January and 14 January) was Plough Monday. It celebrated returning to work after the Christmas celebrations and the New Year.
- 2 February: Candlemas. Although often still very cold, Candlemas was celebrated as the first day of spring. All Christmas decorations were burned on this day, in candlelight and torchlight processions.
- 14 February: Valentine's Day.
- Between 3 March and 9 March: Shrove Tuesday (known as Mardi Gras or Carnival on the Continent). On this day, apprentices were allowed to run amok in the city in mobs, wreaking havoc, because it supposedly cleansed the city of vices before Lent.
  The day after Shrove Tuesday was Ash Wednesday, the first day of Lent when all were to abstain from eating and drinking certain things.
  24 March: Lady Day or the feast of the Annunciation, the first of the Quarter Days on which rents and salaries were due and payable. It was a legal New Year when courts of law convened after a winter break, and it marked the supposed moment when the Angel Gabriel came to announce to the Virgin Mary that she would bear a child.
- 1 May: May Day, celebrated as the first day of summer. This was one of the few Celtic festivals with no connection to Christianity and patterned on Beltane. It featured crowning a May Queen, a Green Man and dancing around a maypole.
- 21 June: Midsummer (Christianized as the feast of John the Baptist) and another Quarter Day.
- 1 August: Lammastide, or Lammas Day. Traditionally, the first day of August, in which it was customary to bring a loaf of bread to the church.
- 29 September: Michaelmas. Another Quarter Day. Michaelmas celebrated the beginning of autumn, and Michael the Archangel.
- 25 October: St. Crispin's Day. Bonfires, revels, and an elected 'King Crispin' were all featured in this celebration. Dramatized by Shakespeare in Henry V.
  28 October: The Lord Mayor's Show, which still takes place today in London.
  31 October: All Hallows' Eve or Halloween. The beginning celebration of the days of the dead.
- 1 November: All Hallows or All Saints' Day, followed by All Souls' Day.
- 17 November: Accession Day or Queen's Day, the anniversary of Queen Elizabeth's accession to the throne, celebrated with lavish court festivities featuring jousting during her lifetime and as a national holiday for dozens of years after her death.
- 24 December: The Twelve Days of Christmas started at sundown and lasted until Epiphany on 6 January. Christmas was the last of the Quarter Days for the year.

== Historiography ==
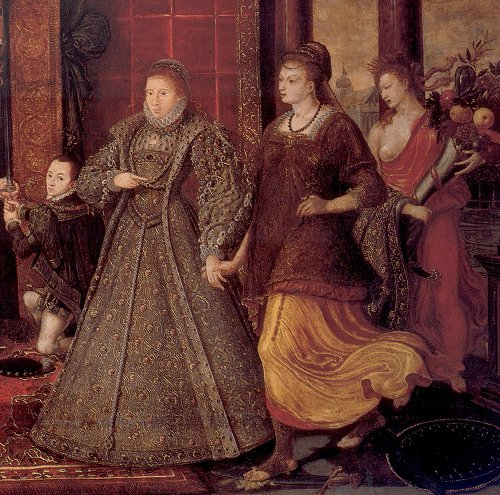
"Elizabeth Ushers in Peace and Plenty." Detail from The Family of Henry VIII: An Allegory of the Tudor Succession, c. 1572, attributed to Lucas de Heere.

The Victorian era and the early 20th century idealised the Elizabethan era. The Encyclopædia Britannica maintains that "[T]he long reign of Elizabeth I, 1558–1603, was England's Golden Age... 'Merry England', in love with life, expressed itself in music and literature, in architecture and adventurous seafaring". This idealising tendency was shared by Britain and Anglophone North America. In popular culture, the image of adventurous Elizabethan seafarers was embodied in the films of Errol Flynn.

Partially in reaction to this hyperbolic idealisation, modern historians and biographers have tended to take a more dispassionate view of the Tudor period.

== See also ==
- 1550–1600 in fashion
- Artists of the Tudor court
- Elizabethan architecture
- Elizabethan government
- Health and diet in Elizabethan England
- Jacobethan (Revival architecture)
- Music in Elizabethan Era
- Nine Years' War (Ireland)
- Tudor architecture
- Tudor money box
- Tudor Revival architecture (Tudorbethan)
