= Distaff Day =

Unofficial observance, 7 January

- Date: 7 January
- Next time: 7 January 2027
- Frequency: annual

Saint Distaff's Day, Distaff Day, or Rock Day is 7 January, the day after Epiphany, and was the traditional day on which women would start spinning again after Christmas.

The distaff, or rock, used in spinning was the medieval symbol of women's work. In many European cultural traditions, women resumed their household work after the twelve days of Christmas. Women of all classes would spend their evenings spinning on the wheel. During the day, they would carry a drop spindle with them. Spinning was the only means of turning raw wool, cotton or flax into thread, which could then be woven into cloth.

Men have their own way of celebrating this occasion, called Plough Monday, the first Monday after Epiphany when men are supposed to get back to work. Every few years, Distaff Day and Plough Monday fall on the same day.

Often the men and women would play pranks on each other during this celebration, as described by Robert Herrick in his poem "St. Distaff's Day", which appears in his Hesperides (1648). Though this custom is described in several nineteenth-century sources, it is unclear how widespread or long-lasting this custom actually was; similarities in these nineteenth-century accounts suggest that they all ultimately derive from Herrick's poem.

In the 20th century, Herrick's poem was set to music.

Some modern craft groups have taken up the celebration of Distaff Day as part of their New Year celebrations. Distaff Day gatherings are held, large and small, throughout local fiber communities.
