= Goathland Plough Stots =

Traditional dancing group from Yorkshire, England

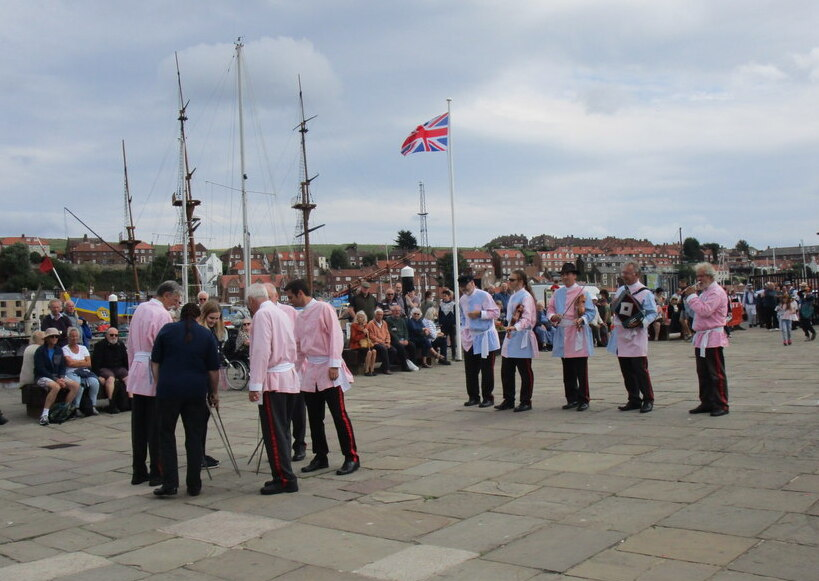
The Goathland Plough Stots at Whitby Folk Week, 2018

The Goathland Plough Stots are a team of long sword dancers based in the village of Goathland, North Yorkshire, England. The traditional dance that they perform had died out by the start of the twentieth century but was revived in 1923. The team were expelled from the Morris Ring for allowing women to be trained in the art of the dance, the tradition being that it is a male-only dance. The Goathland Plough Stots dance is recognised as one of the oldest in England, with a history dating back more than a thousand years.

== History ==
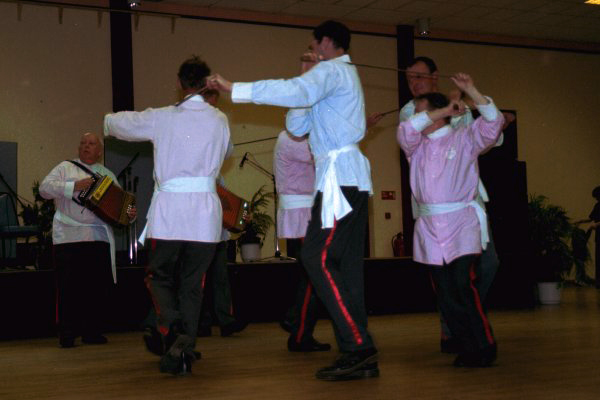
Goathland Plough Stots in action

The long sword dance dates back to the time of the Viking invasions in England, with the dance and associated play acted out by the Goathland Plough Stots recognised as one of the oldest dances of its type in England, dating back over a thousand years. Various other locations across the North Riding of Yorkshire had groups that performed similar long sword dances; (Note: The locations given in Yorkshire are ones that have a traditional long sword dance, different from the short (or rapier) dances which were prevalent in County Durham and Northumberland.) Egton, Flamborough, Sleights and Staithes. When Cecil Sharp notarised and formalised the dances and tunes of the traditional village dances he ignored the Goathland dance on account of it being "too similar to the Sleights dance."

In the 18th and 19th centuries almost every village in Eskdale had a long sword dance team. By the time that Cecil Sharp had visited this area of North Yorkshire in the early part of the 20th century only Sleights and Goathland still had their teams. Other dances were to be found across North Yorkshire, concentrated around York and the ironstone-mining communities of Boosbeck and Lingdale. The Goathland Plough Stots Dance originated around Plough Monday, usually the first Monday after Epiphany, and had the dancers wearing either pink or blue tunics. It is known that the accompanying play was heavily edited when it was revived and tabulated by authors on the subject owing to its rude nature. Goathland's Plough Monday celebrations appear to have stopped in the 1870s.

== Revival ==
In the 1920s, inspired by the work of Cecil Sharp, Frank Dowson and Major Fairfax-Blakeborough worked to revive the dance. It is uncertain what sources were used by the revivalists for their dance; possibly they based it on Sharp's account of the Sleights dance, or were taught by Sleights dancers.

When the dance was revived in 1923 so too were the associated players and the play that accompanied the dance. The dancers (or Stots) would drag a plough through the village and threaten to plough someone's garden unless they contributed funds for the young stots. An older player would dress up as a woman, known as Betty, and another would dress up as an old man (Isaac), and they would form the gentleman and lady of the play. The stots were originally the oxen that pulled the plough but later became the name by which the long sword players were known. In the revived dance, monies collected would be given to local hospitals, and after some time travelling across the local community (sometimes up to two weeks of dancing and collecting) the Plough Stots would have a feast at one of the local inns. The custom of collecting money was originally thought to be to pay for new candles that had been burnt over the twelve days of Christmas, which ended the day before Plough Monday. Additionally, the plough was blessed by a church service, which continued at Goathland into the 21st century, but is said to take places in only a few churches in the modern day.

In the early 2010s, recognising that the tradition was in danger of dying out, the Plough Stots started training females in the art of the dance. This meant that they were "excommunicated from the Morris Ring", the National Association of Men's Morris and Sword Dance Clubs. Apart from a period during the Second World War, the Plough Stots have been dancing continually each Plough Monday since 1923. The revived dance is most commonly performed on or around Plough Monday, though it has also been performed on other occasions such as to mark the coronation of Elizabeth II in 1953.

== Notable members ==
- Eliza Carthy, folk musician from the Robin Hood's Bay area, joined the team as a fiddler in her teenage years
