= Long sword dance =

English folk dance

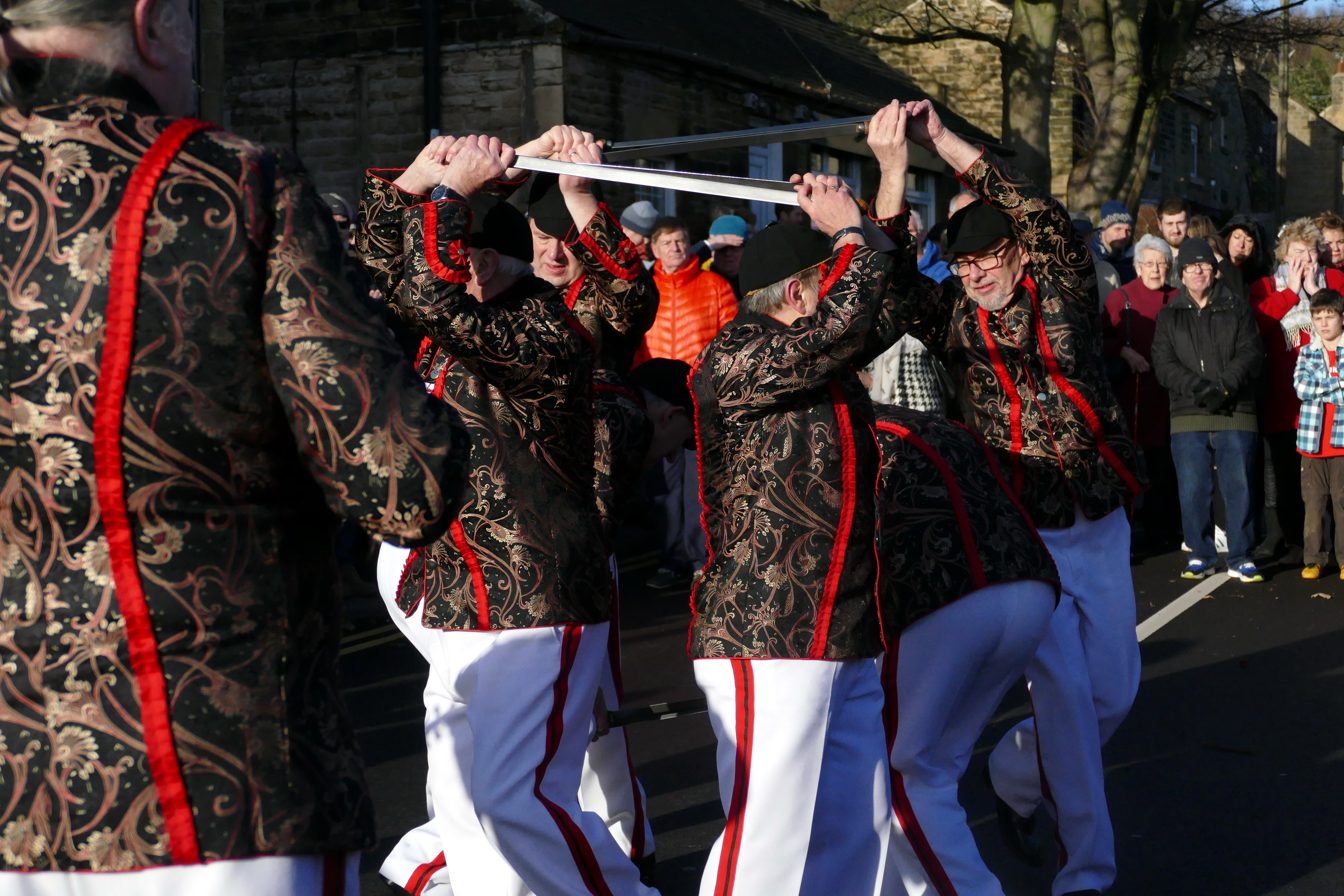
2016 Grenoside Boxing Day dance

The long sword dance (Note: The Morris Ring refer to the dance tradition as longsword as do EFDSS. However the Goathland Plough Stots website uses long sword.) is a hilt-and-point sword dance recorded mainly in Yorkshire, England. The dances are usually performed around Christmas time.

== History ==
Hilt-and-point sword dances, of which English long sword dance is an example, have been found across northern, western, and central Europe, with records dating from at least the fifteenth and possibly the fourteenth century. It is unclear to what extent the existing continental European sword dance traditions influenced the English long sword dance. In England there is little evidence about the history of sword dancing before the mid-eighteenth century. The first reference to the characteristic "lock" in England comes from 1777, and the earliest references to sword dancing in Yorkshire come from the early nineteenth century. Cecil Sharp and other 20th Century folklorists believed that the dances originated from a religious or magical ceremony that was performed around Plough Monday to promote fertile soil; later researchers have cast doubt on such findings.

The long sword dance is related to the rapper sword dance of Northumbria, but the character is fundamentally different as it uses rigid metal or wooden swords, rather than the flexible spring steel rappers used by its northern relation.

== Location ==
Long sword dances are most commonly found in Yorkshire and the southern part of County Durham, with particular concentrations of dances in East Cleveland, the northern part of the North York Moors and around Sheffield. Outliers were also recorded in the East Midlands and elsewhere in Northeastern England.

== Performances ==
Newcastle Kingsmen performing Kirkby Malzeard long sword dance at Sidmouth Folk Festival, 2011

Unlike many traditional dances in England, which are mainly performed by revival teams, long sword dances are often still performed by their own village teams, such as Grenoside Sword Dancers, the Goathland Plough Stots and Flamborough Sword Dancers. These teams generally maintain the traditions of their dances, such as traditional performances on Boxing Day or Plough Monday.

Long sword dances vary in the way they are performed, with some being slow and militaristic, such as the Grenoside or performed with pace and speed like Handsworth dances from near Sheffield. Others have different features including variations of numbers of dancers and distinctive movements.

In addition to performances by traditional long sword teams in their own location, long sword teams also appear at folk festivals such as the Sidmouth Folk Festival and the Beverley Folk Festival.

Dedicated long sword festivals have also been held in the UK. The International Sword Spectacular took place in Whitby, England, in May 2004 and was held again in York in May 2008.

== Gallery ==
Some photographs of Grenoside Sword Dancers performing the Grenoside sword dance on Boxing Day, the traditional day the dance is performed.

Long sword dancing

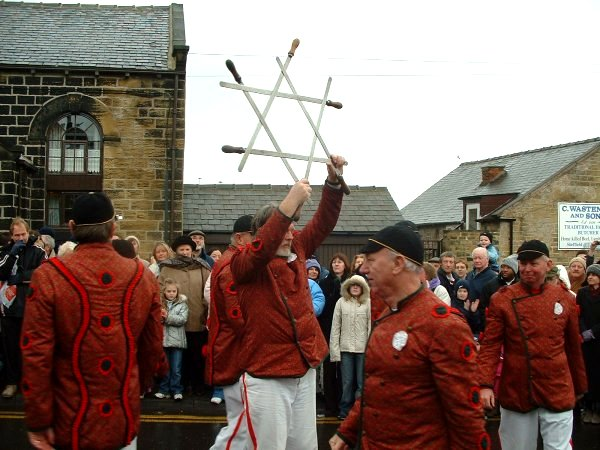
Boxing Day 2005 - The Grenoside Sword Dance Captain holds aloft the sword lock before placing it around his neck

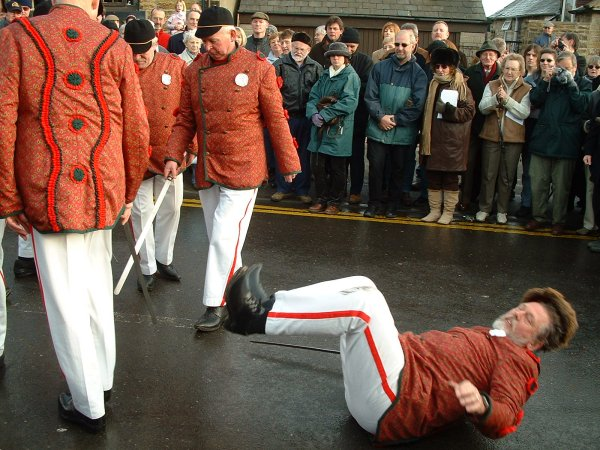
Boxing Day 2004 - The Grenoside Sword Dance Captain is ritually "beheaded" as the dancers withdraw their swords sharply from around his neck

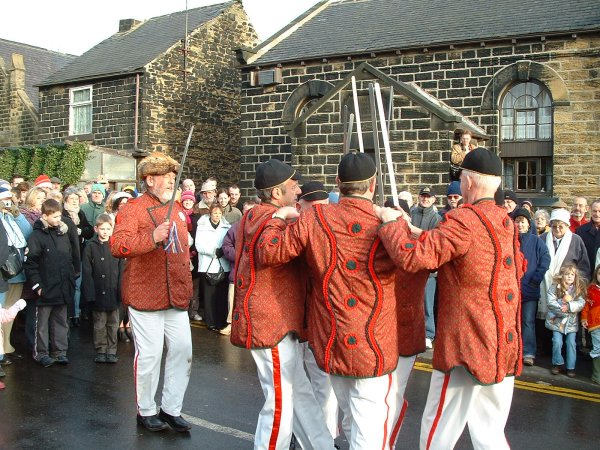
The final figure in the Sword Dance
