= Distaff =

Stick or staff for holding fibre to be spun

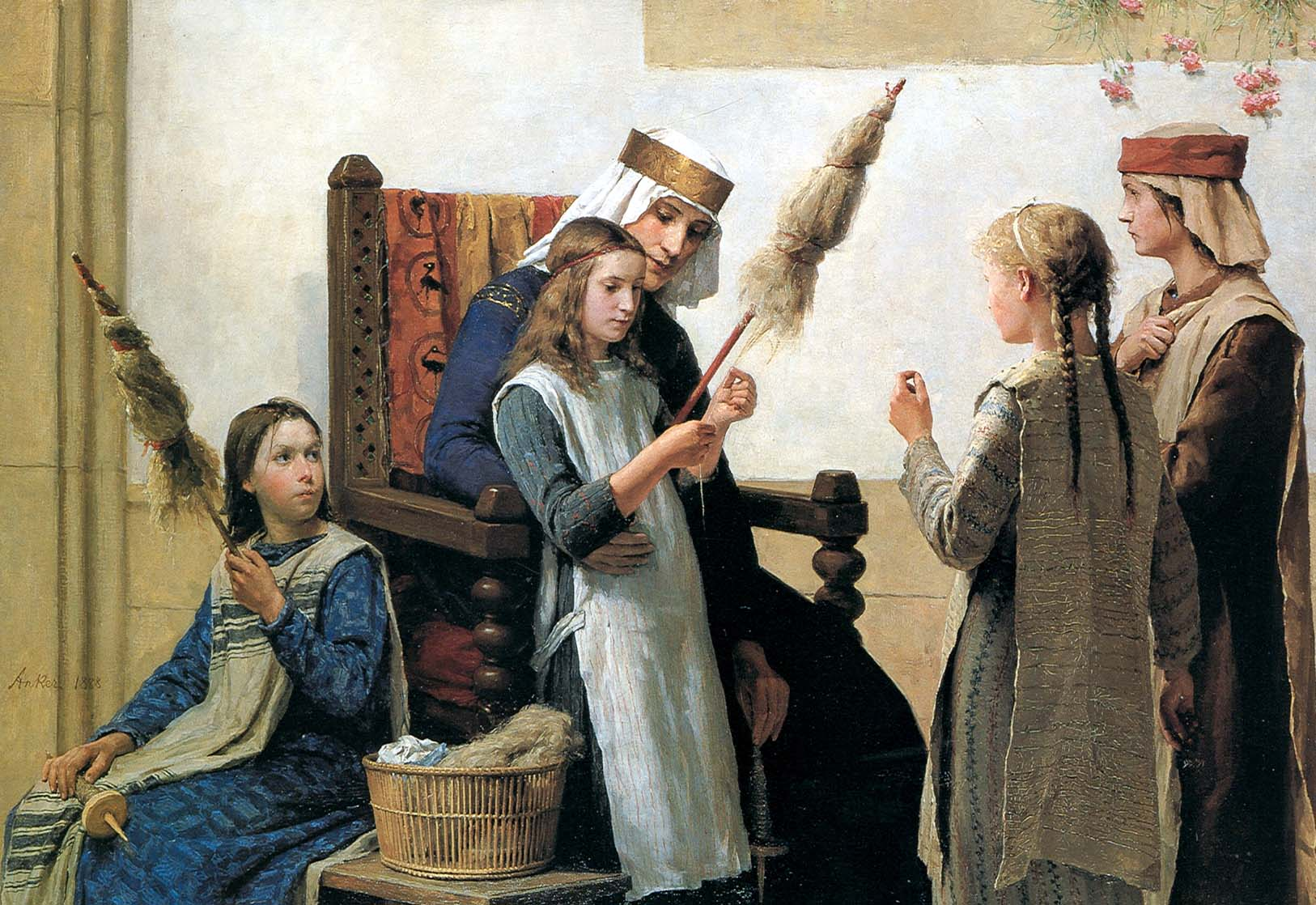
Queen Bertha instructing girls to spin flax on spindles using distaves, Albert Anker, 1888

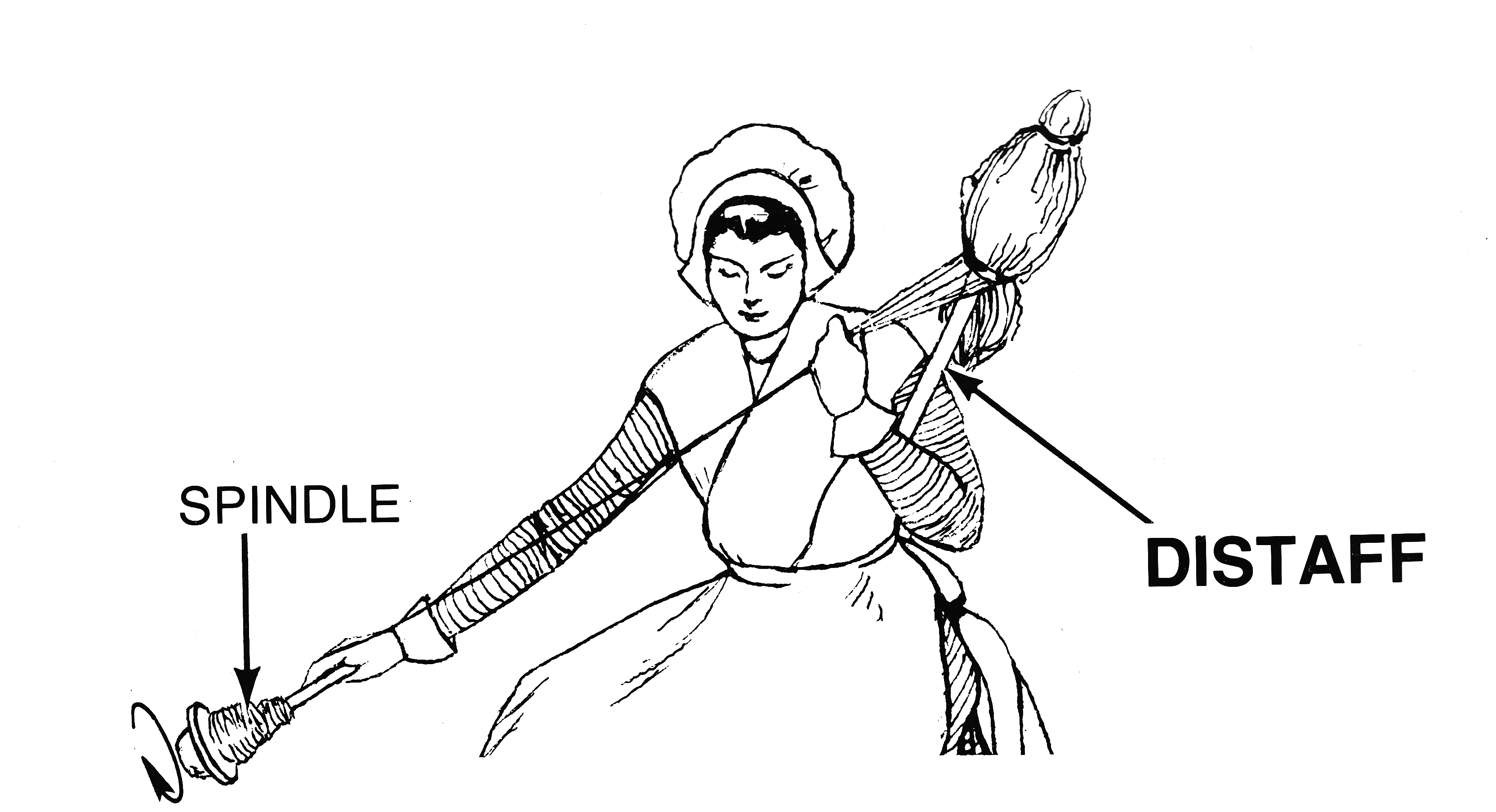
A distaff and a spindle

A distaff (/ˈdɪstɑːf/, /ˈdɪstæf/, also called a rock) is a tool used in spinning. It is designed to hold the unspun fibers, keeping them untangled and thus easing the spinning process. It is most commonly used to hold flax and sometimes wool, but can be used for any type of fibre. Fiber is wrapped around the distaff and tied in place with a piece of ribbon or string. The word comes from Low German dis, meaning a bunch of flax, connected with staff.

As an adjective, the term distaff is used to describe the female side of a family. The corresponding term for the male side of a family is the "spear" side.

== Form ==
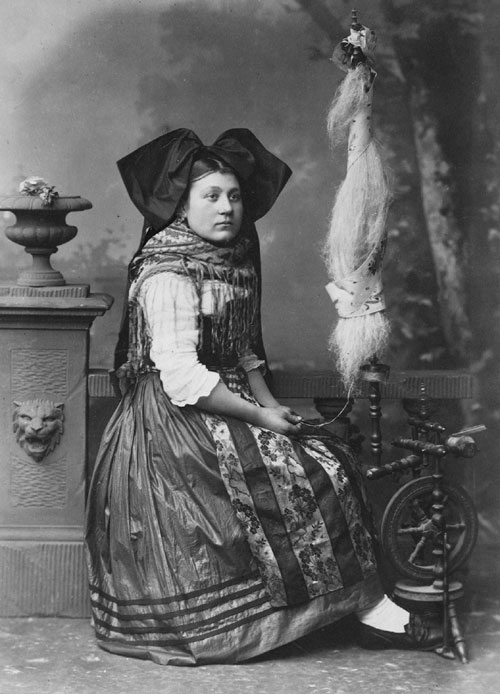
Alsatian spinner with wheel and distaff

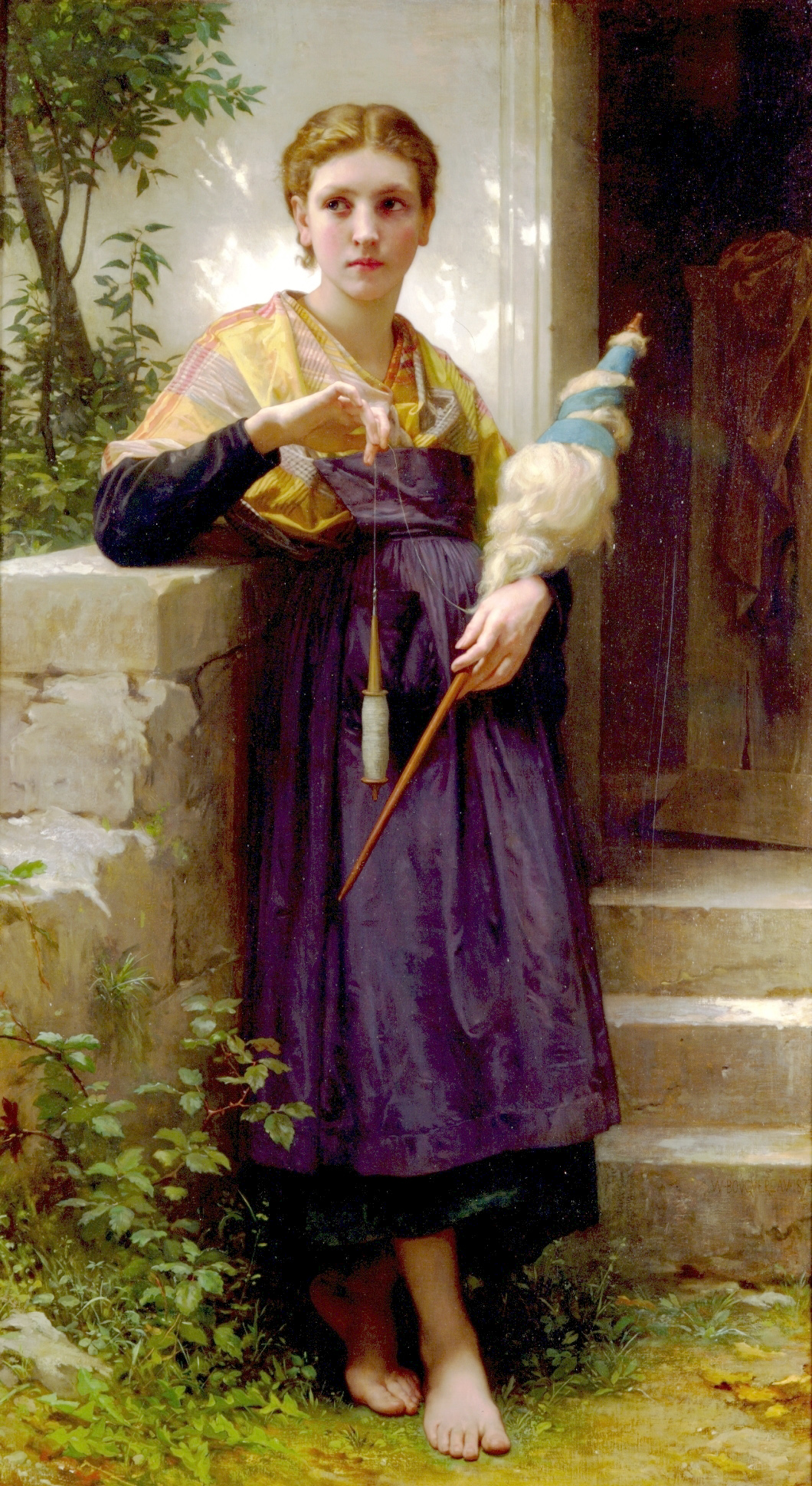
The Spinner by William-Adolphe Bouguereau (1873), shown with spindle and distaff

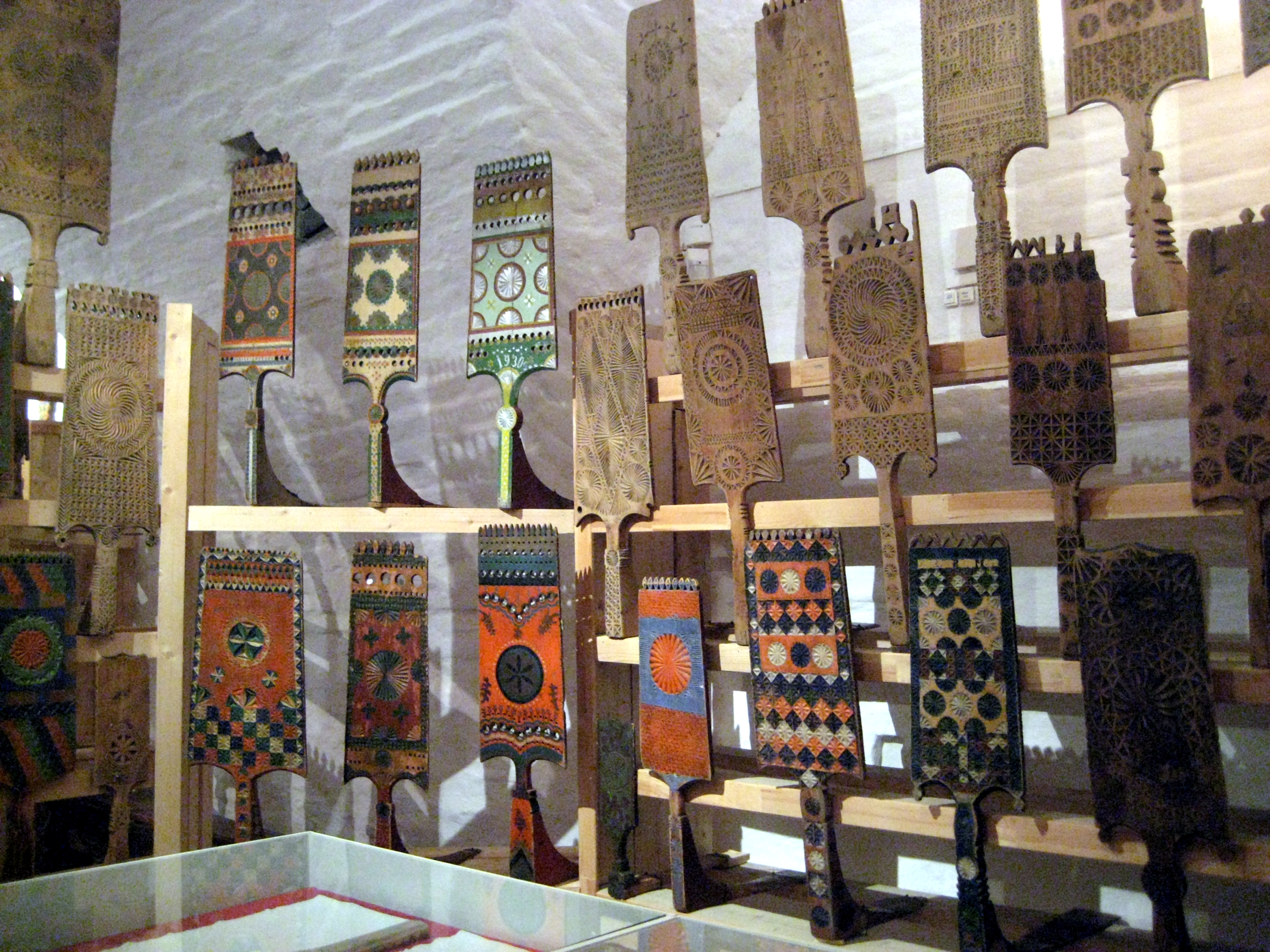
Russian distaves displayed at the museum of folk handicrafts at Ferapontov Monastery

In Western Europe, there were two common forms of distaff, depending on the spinning method. The traditional form is a staff held under one's arm while using a spindle – see the figure illustration. It is about 3 feet (0.9 m) long, held under the left arm, with the fibres drawn from it by the right hand. This version is the older of the two, as spindle-spinning predates spinning on a wheel.

A distaff can also be mounted as an attachment to a spinning wheel. On a wheel, it is placed next to the bobbin, where it is in easy reach of the spinner. This version is shorter, but otherwise does not differ from the spindle version.

By contrast, the traditional Russian distaff used both with spinning wheels and with spindles, is L-shaped and consists of a horizontal board, known as the dontse (Russian: донце), and a flat vertical piece, frequently oar-shaped, to the inner side of which the bundle of fibers was tied or pinned. The spinner sat on the dontse, with the vertical piece of the distaff to their left, and drew the fibers out with the left hand. The distaff was often richly carved and painted and was an important element of Russian folk art.

Recently, handspinners have begun using wrist distaffs to hold the fiber; these are made of flexible material, such as braided yarn, and can swing freely from the wrist. A wrist distaff generally consists of a loop with a tail, at the end of which is a tassel, often with beads on each strand. The spinner wraps the roving or tow around the tail and through the loop to keep it out of the way and to keep it from getting snagged.

== Dressing ==
Dressing a distaff is the act of wrapping the fiber around the distaff. With flax, the wrapping is done by laying the flax fibers down, approximately parallel to each other and the distaff, then carefully rolling the fibers onto the distaff. A ribbon or string is then tied at the top and loosely wrapped around the fibers to keep them in place.

== Other meanings ==
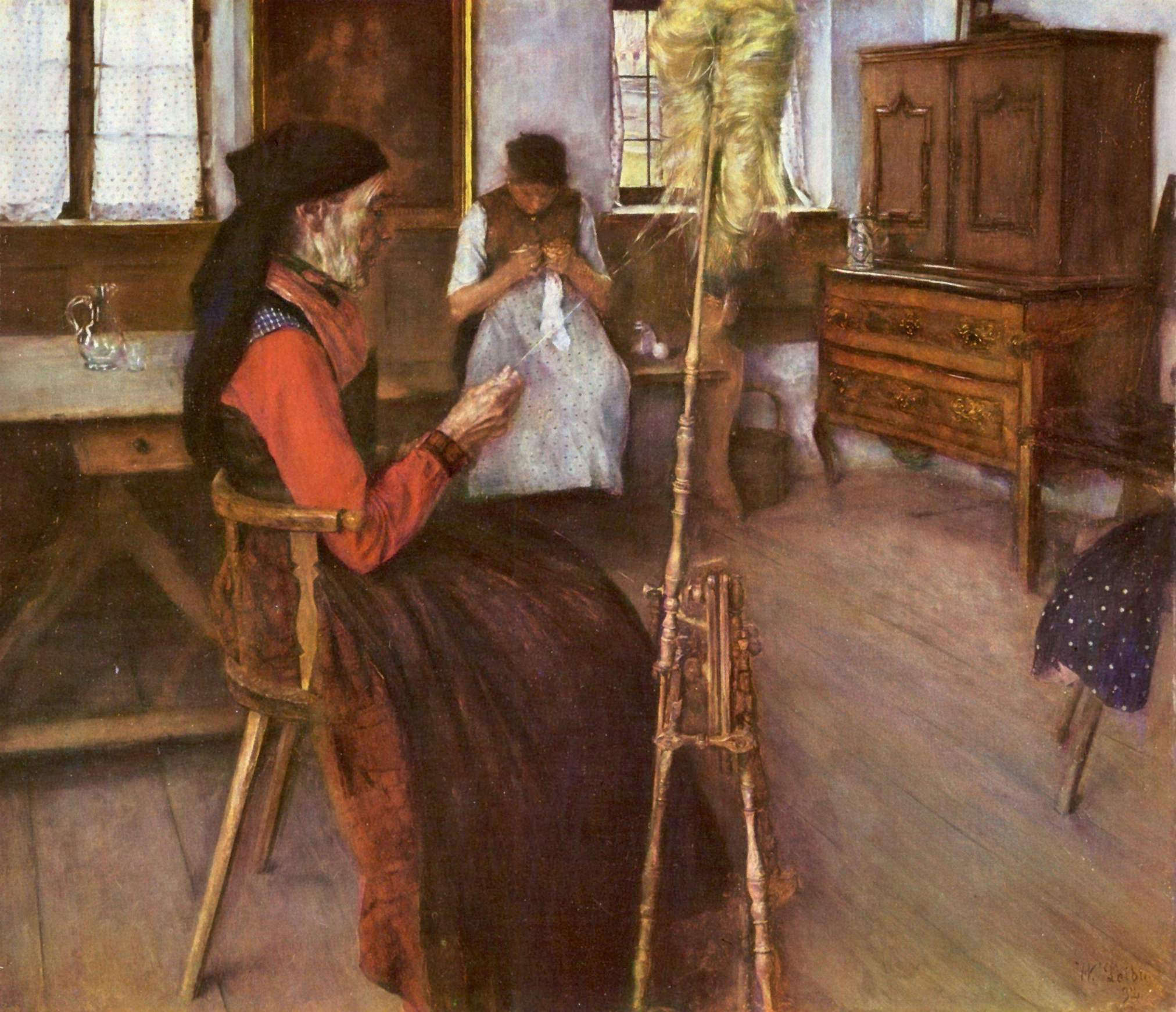
The Spinner, by Wilhelm Leibl (1892), features spinning flax from a distaff.

The term distaff is used as an adjective to describe the matrilineal branch of a family, i.e., to the person's mother and her blood relatives. This term developed in the English-speaking communities where a distaff spinning tool was used to symbolize domestic life. Proverbs 31 cites the "wife of noble character" as one who "holds the distaff".

Another use of the term is in horse racing, in which races limited to female horses are referred to as distaff races. From 1984 until 2007, at the American Breeders' Cup, the major race for fillies and mares was the Breeders' Cup Distaff. From 2008 to 2012, the event was called the Breeders' Cup Ladies' Classic. Starting in 2013, the name of the race changed back to Breeders' Cup Distaff. It is the female analog of the better-known Breeders' Cup Classic, though female horses are not barred from that race.

The phrase "on the distaff side" was used by reporters covering athletic competitions when transitioning from men's events over to the women's events.

In Norse mythology, the goddess Frigg spins clouds from her bejewelled distaff in the Norse constellation known as Frigg's Spinning Wheel (Friggerock, also known as Orion's Belt).

== In popular culture ==
- The Women's division of the mixed-martial-arts organization EXC (Elite Xtreme Combat) is known as the "Distaff Division".
- In the video game Loom by Lucasfilm Games (1990), the Weavers' Guild, the game's equivalent to wizards, and the main character, Bobbin Threadbare, use wooden staves called "distaffs" to control their magic, with which they "weave the very fabric of reality".

== See also ==
- Distaff Day
- Spindle (textiles)
- Wand
