= Molly dance =

English folk dance tradition

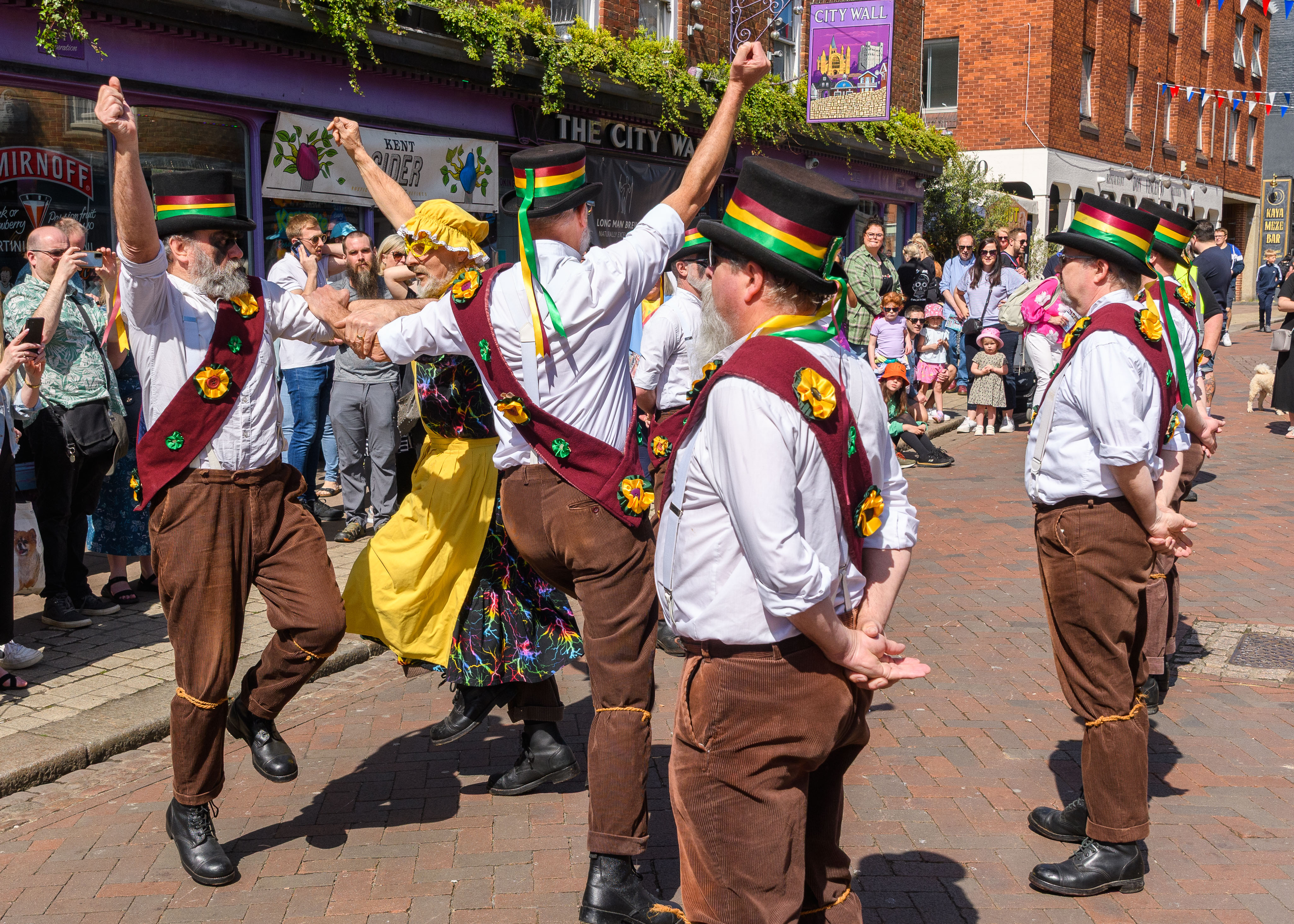
Seven Champions Molly dancers at Sweeps Festival, 2024.

Molly dancing is a form of English Morris dance from East Anglia, traditionally performed by out-of-work ploughboys over the winter. It was especially associated with Boxing Day and Plough Monday. Cross-dressing was a characteristic feature of the dance: at least one, and in some accounts as many as half, of the men performing the dance dressed in women's clothing. First attested in the 1820s, the tradition continued in a few villages into the 1930s; by 1940 it had died out entirely.

Molly dance was largely ignored by folk dance collectors, who did not consider it worthy of study; they collected only a handful of dances before the practice died out. From the 1970s, there was a revival of interest in Molly dancing. In 1977 two Cambridgeshire teams resumed dancing on Plough Monday and many other dance teams have since included Molly dance in their repertoire, of which the Kent-based Seven Champions have been particularly influential.

== History ==
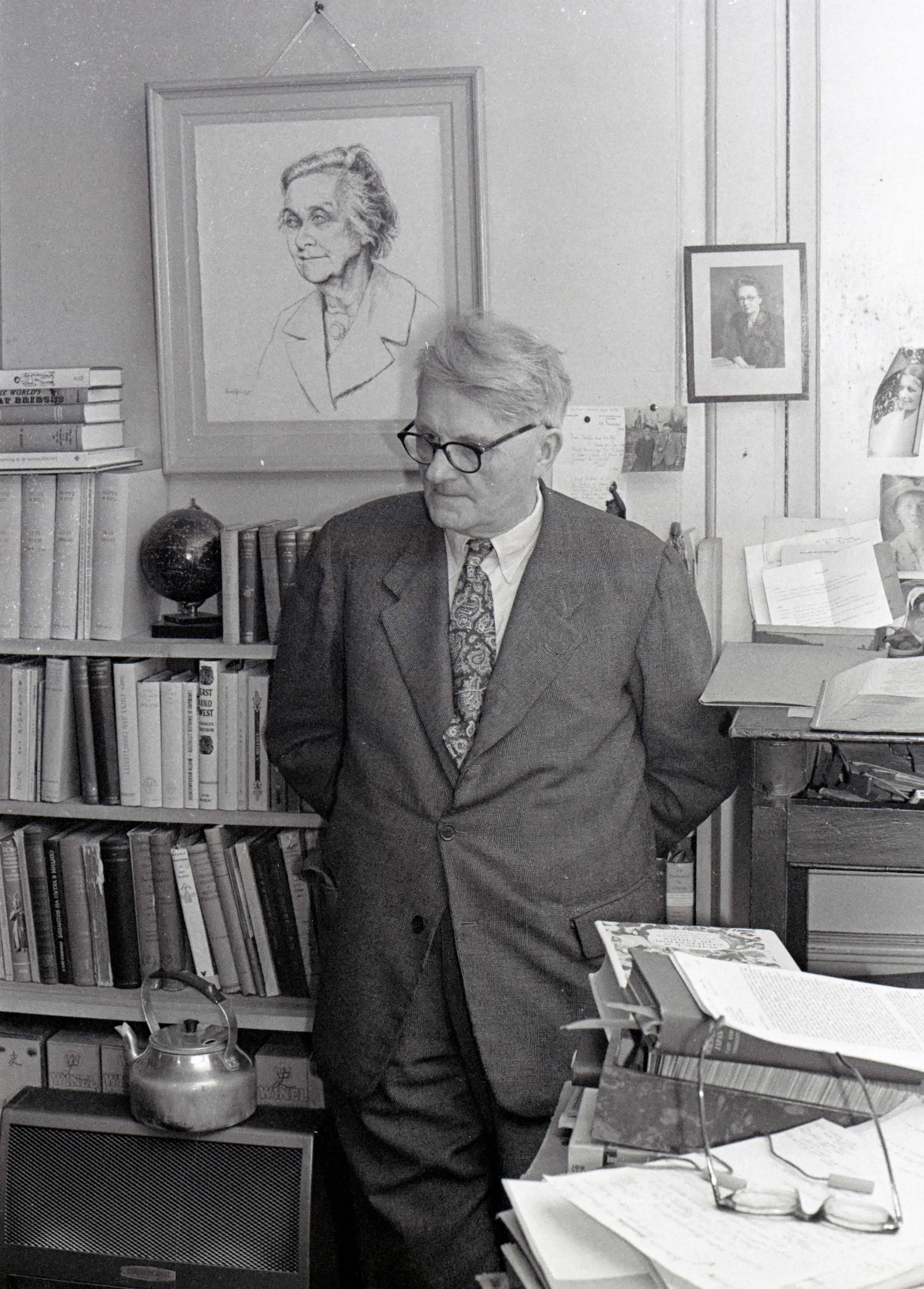
Joseph Needham collected Molly dances in the early 1930s, as the tradition was dying out

Molly dancing is a dance tradition from East Anglia, traditionally performed on Boxing Day (26 December) and Plough Monday (the Monday after 6 January). Plough Monday has long been an important date in the East Anglian calendar, and its celebration can be traced back to the fifteenth century; Molly dancing is first attested in the 1820s.

The earliest known use of the term Molly dance in relation to this tradition was in 1850. It probably derives from the word molly meaning an effeminate, homosexual, or cross-dressing man, referring to the invariable presence of men dressed in women's clothing among the dancers; an alternative possibility is that it is a corruption of Morris dance.

In 1911 Cecil Sharp interviewed a man from Little Downham about Plough Monday dancing, but he did not consider it worthy of further study. The practice was largely ignored by collectors of folk dances until the 1930s, by which time Molly dancing continued in only a few villages. In 1930, Joseph Needham and Arthur Peck collected four Molly dances from a dancer from Girton and a concertina player from Histon, two villages near Cambridge; they continued to collect information about Molly dancing over the following three years. William Palmer recorded a broom dance performed by the Little Downham dancers in 1933. The tradition had died out by 1940. In 1978, Russell Wortley and Cyril Papworth published four dances collected from the Comberton Molly dancers.

The recorded dances are largely ordinary social dances of the period, rather than special Molly dances. Needham and Peck proposed that a previous dance tradition, perhaps a kind of sword dance, had at some point been lost, and Molly dancing had been revived using social dances. Molly dances were simple, most commonly danced in longways sets, and were accompanied by popular tunes. The music was provided by a fiddler – or, from the latter half of the nineteenth century, concertina- or accordion-player – who was usually hired for the occasion rather than being a farmworker like the other performers; there was sometimes also a percussionist.

== Traditions ==
Traditionally, Molly dancing took place over the Christmas season, particularly on Boxing Day and Plough Monday (the first Monday after Epiphany). Pre-revival Molly dancing was an all-male tradition; though women sometimes joined in the dancing they were not part of the Molly teams. Unemployed farmworkers danced both to entertain themselves and as a way of making some money in a season where there was little demand for agricultural labour. In some cases, the money raised was used for charity – as for instance in Brandon Creek, near Littleport, where until the 1850s it was used to buy food for local widows. In the late-nineteenth and early-twentieth centuries, groups of children were also known to go Molly dancing.

Molly dancers dressed in ordinary clothes decorated with ribbons and rosettes, wore top hats, and blacked their faces as a form of disguise. Some wore sashes in a particular colour to denote their village. One or more dancers dressed in women's clothing – in some accounts half of the dancers were dressed as women. Along with the dancers, Molly teams were accompanied by various other men who performed specific roles, including an umbrella man, to protect the musician from the weather; a sweeper, who carried a broom and would clear a space for the dancers; and the man responsible for the money box. The Molly team seen by William Palmer at Little Downham in 1933 consisted of six men, one dressed as a woman; of the remaining five, one carried a broom and money box, and one played the accordion. The musician wore ordinary clothes, while the other men wore frock coats and top hats; all five had blackened faces and wore ribbons on their clothes.

== Revival ==
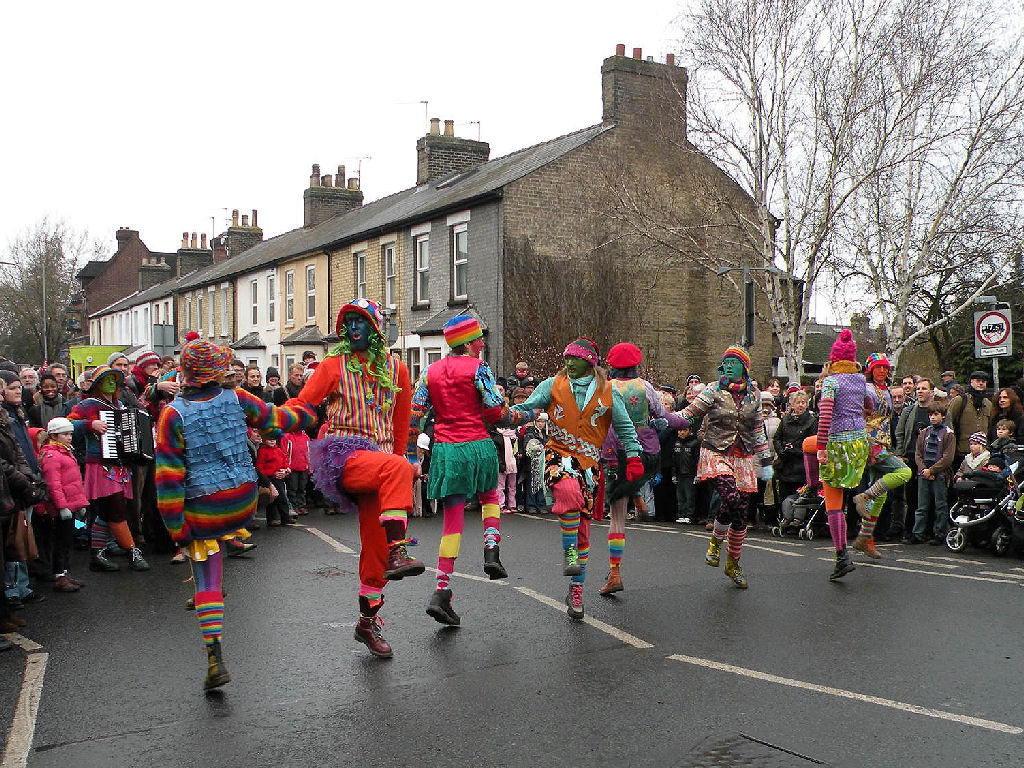
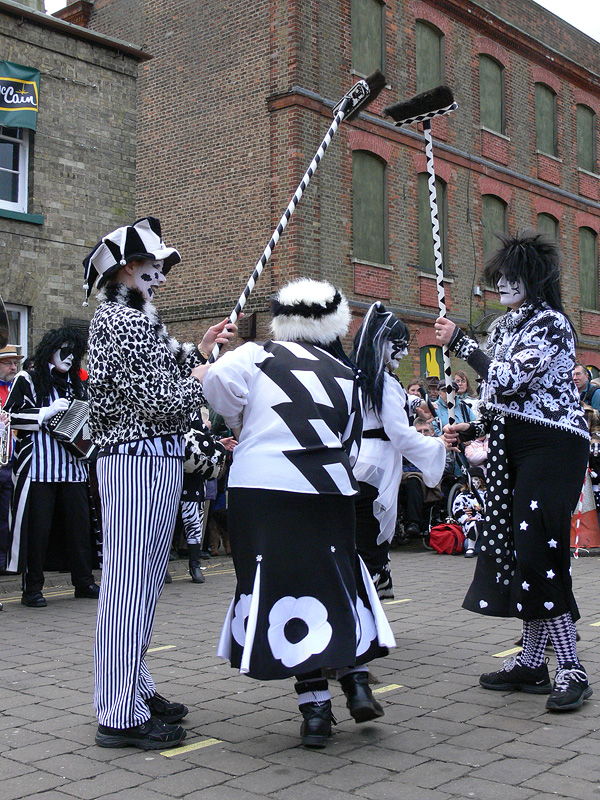
Modern Molly sides: Gog Magog Molly (left) in their colourful costumes; Pig Dyke Molly (right) in black and white.

Molly dancing was revived in the late 1970s, when teams began to once again perform the preserved dances. At this time, Cotswold-style morris dancing was the most common type of display dance performed by folk dancers; a growing number of people who disliked Cotswold morris were looking for alternatives. In 1976, Ashley Hutchings (who had been a founding member of the British folk-rock bands Fairport Convention and Steeleye Span) released Rattlebone and Ploughjack, a compilation of recordings related to Molly and border morris dance, helping to revive interest in both styles.

By 1976, Russell Wortley was teaching Molly dance based on the material he had collected, and in 1977 the Cambridge Morris Men resumed Molly dancing on Plough Monday. The Mepal Molly Men, who based their dancing off of the recollection of two of the dancers from Little Downham in the 1930s, also began to perform in 1977. Another early side, the Seven Champions, was founded in 1977 by members of Headcorn morris in Kent, having been to one of Wortley's workshops. Their first performance, in December 1977, featured a Molly dance alongside a Kentish mummers' play. In 1983 they taught their own Molly dancing workshop for the first time. The Champions, who were inspired by the style of the Shropshire Bedlams border morris side, became one of the most influential teams in the Molly dance revival. By the year 2000, over 20 dance teams included Molly dancing in their repertoire.

Modern Molly groups tend to reject many of the conventions of Cotswold morris (e.g. the white clothes, bells and handkerchiefs); stylistically they favour more simple choreography, heavier stepping, and are described by Elaine Bradtke as "more rough and wild than graceful". Most teams blacken their faces, or wear face paint or masks; often teams feature some cross-dressing. Some revival sides perform Molly dance as part of a larger repertoire of display dances, or are associated with teams from other forms of display dance, such as Cotswold morris, though they generally distinguish their Molly- and Morris dancing costume. Molly teams are more commonly mixed-gender than in other styles of English display dance.

Some more traditionalist teams restrict their performance to the winter season, or specifically Plough Monday, and perform the collected dances only. Other teams dance Molly year-round; these tend to compose their own dances in order to have enough material. Modern dances composed specifically for Molly sides often have complex choreography, and are less closely related to social dances than the traditional ones were.

== Works cited ==
- Bradtke, Elaine (1997). Molly Dancing and the Seven Champions: Post-Modernism and the Reinvention of Tradition (PhD thesis). University of Maryland.
- Bradtke, Elaine (1999). Truculent Rustics: Molly Dancing in East Anglia Before 1940. London: FLS Books.
- Bradtke, Elaine (2001). "Molly Dancing: A Study of Discontinuity and Change". In Boyes, Georgina (ed.). Step Change: New Views on Traditional Dance. Francis Boutle.
- Frampton, George (2002). "The Molly Dance Revival". Morris Matters. 21 (1).
- Frampton, George (2022). "Expanding the Frontier, Part Three – Thoughts on the Cambridgeshire Molly". Morris Matters. 41 (1).
- Forster, Tony (2002). Molly Dancing into the Twenty-First Century. Morris Federation. ISBN 0948383135.
- Irvine, Richard D. G. (2018). "Following the Bear: The revival of Plough Monday traditions and the performance of rural identity in the East Anglian fenlands". Ethnoscripts. 20 (1). doi:10.15460/ethnoscripts.2018.20.1.1237.
- Needham, Joseph; Peck, Arthur L. (1933). "Molly Dancing in East Anglia". Journal of the English Folk Dance and Song Society. 1 (2): 79–85. JSTOR 4521024.
- Palmer, William (1974). "Plough Monday 1933 at Little Downham". English Dance and Song. 36 (1).
- Simons, Matthew (2019). Morris Men: Dancing Englishness, c.1905-1951 (PDF) (PhD thesis). De Montfort University.
- Simpson, Jacqueline; Roud, Steve, eds. (2003). "Molly dancing". A Dictionary of English Folklore. Oxford University Press. doi:10.1093/acref/9780198607663.001.0001.
- Swift, John (2020). "The Border Morris: Developments Since 1963". The Morris Dancer. 6 (2).
- Wortley, Russell; Papworth, Cyril (1978). "Molly Dancing in South West Cambridgeshire". English Dance and Song.
