= List of ministers to Elizabeth I =

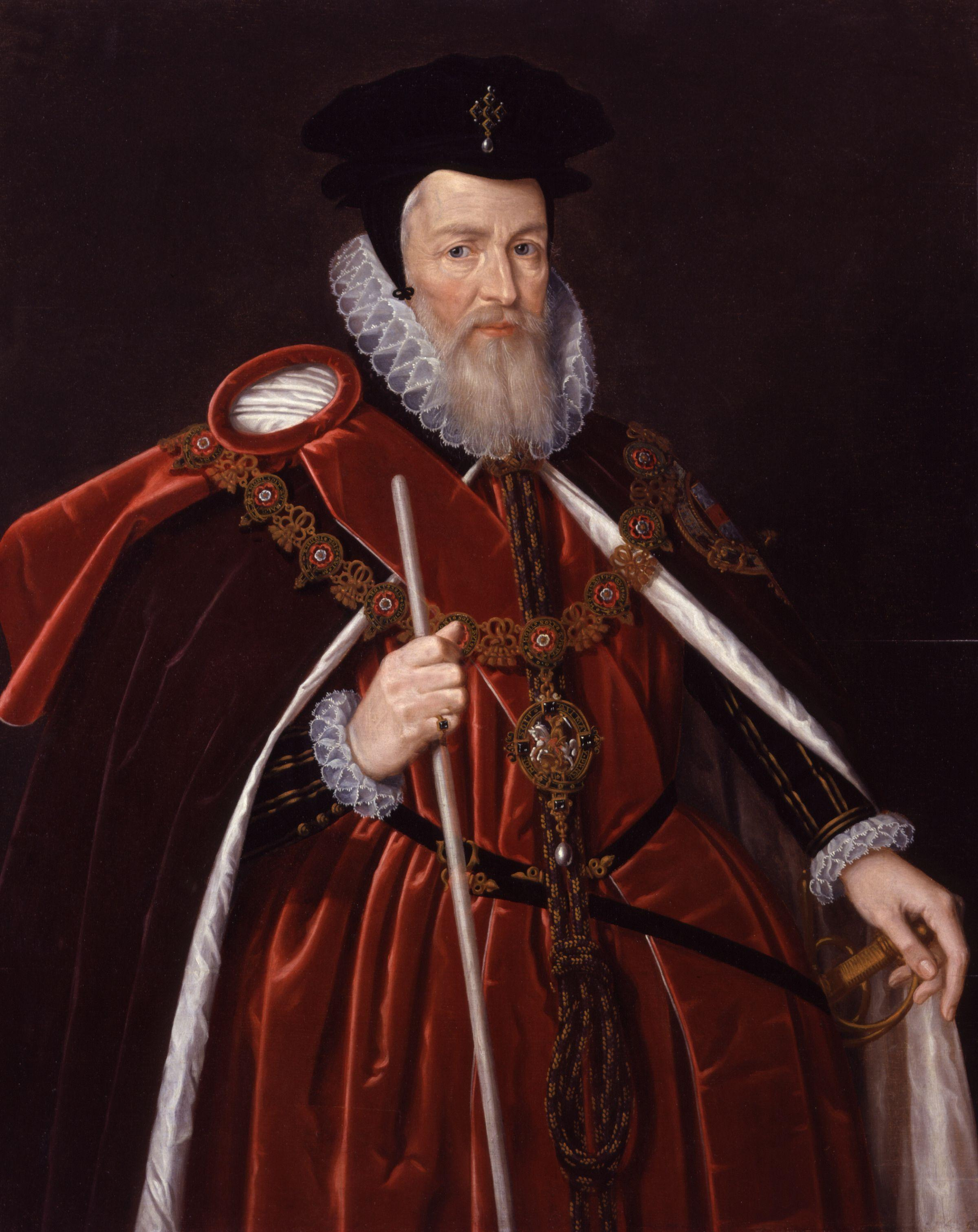
Lord Burghley was the longest-serving minister to Queen Elizabeth I.

This is a list of the principal government ministers during the reign of Elizabeth I of England, 1558 to 1603. From the outset of her reign, her chief minister was Sir William Cecil, later Lord Burghley. He died in 1598 and was succeeded by his son Sir Robert Cecil.

Office	Name	Date	Notes
Lord Chancellor; Lord Keeper of the Great Seal	Sir Nicholas Bacon	1558	
Lord Chancellor; Lord Keeper of the Great Seal	Sir Thomas Bromley	1579	
Lord Chancellor; Lord Keeper of the Great Seal	Sir Christopher Hatton	1587	
Lord Chancellor; Lord Keeper of the Great Seal	in commission	1591	
Lord Chancellor; Lord Keeper of the Great Seal	Sir John Puckering	1592	
Lord Chancellor; Lord Keeper of the Great Seal	Sir Thomas Egerton	1596	
Lord Treasurer	The Marquess of Winchester	continued in office	
Lord Treasurer	The Lord Burghley	1572	
Lord Treasurer	The Lord Buckhurst	1599	
Lord Privy Seal	Sir Nicholas Bacon	1558	
Lord Privy Seal	The Lord Burghley	1571	
Lord Privy Seal	The Lord Howard of Effingham	1572	
Lord Privy Seal	Sir Thomas Smith	1573	
Lord Privy Seal	Francis Walsingham	1576	knighted in 1577
Lord Privy Seal	The Lord Burghley	1590	
Lord Privy Seal	Sir Robert Cecil	1598	
Secretary of State	Sir William Cecil	1558	
Secretary of State	Sir Thomas Smith	1572	
Secretary of State	Sir Thomas Smith; Francis Walsingham	1573	
Secretary of State	Sir Francis Walsingham; Thomas Wilson	1577	
Secretary of State	Sir Francis Walsingham	1581	
Secretary of State	Sir Francis Walsingham; William Davison	1586	
Secretary of State	Sir Francis Walsingham	1587	
Secretary of State	vacant	1590	
Secretary of State	Sir Robert Cecil	1596	
Chancellor of the Exchequer	Sir Richard Sackville		
Chancellor of the Exchequer	Sir Walter Mildmay	1566	
Chancellor of the Exchequer	Sir John Fortescue	1589	
Lord High Admiral	The Lord Clinton	1558	created Earl of Lincoln in 1572
Lord High Admiral	The Lord Howard of Effingham	1585	created Earl of Nottingham in 1596
Master-General of the Ordnance	Sir Richard Southwell	continued in office	
Master-General of the Ordnance	The Earl of Warwick	1560	
Master-General of the Ordnance	The Earl of Warwick; Sir Philip Sidney	1585	
Master-General of the Ordnance	The Earl of Warwick	1586	
Master-General of the Ordnance	vacant	1590	
Master-General of the Ordnance	Sir Robert Cecil	1598	
Master-General of the Ordnance	The Earl of Essex	1597	
Master-General of the Ordnance	vacant	1601	
Lord Steward	The Earl of Arundel	continued in office	
Lord Steward	The Earl of Pembroke	1568	
Lord Steward	vacant	1570	
Lord Steward	The Earl of Leicester	1587	
Lord Steward	Lord St John of Basing	1588	
Lord Chamberlain	The Lord Howard of Effingham	continued in office	
Lord Chamberlain	The Earl of Sussex	1572	
Lord Chamberlain	The 1st Lord Hunsdon	1585	
Lord Chamberlain	The 2nd Lord Cobham	1596	
Lord Chamberlain	The 2nd Lord Hunsdon	1597	
Cofferer of the Household	Sir Henry Cocke	by 1572	
Cofferer of the Household	John Habington	1580-81	
Master of the Horse	Lord Robert Dudley	1558	created Earl of Leicester in 1564
Master of the Horse	The Earl of Essex	1588	
Master of the Horse	The Earl of Worcester	1602	

Other important ministers were Sir Francis Knollys and James Windebank.

== Sources ==
- Haydn's Book of Dignities, 1894
