= Plough Monday =

Traditional English start of the agricultural year

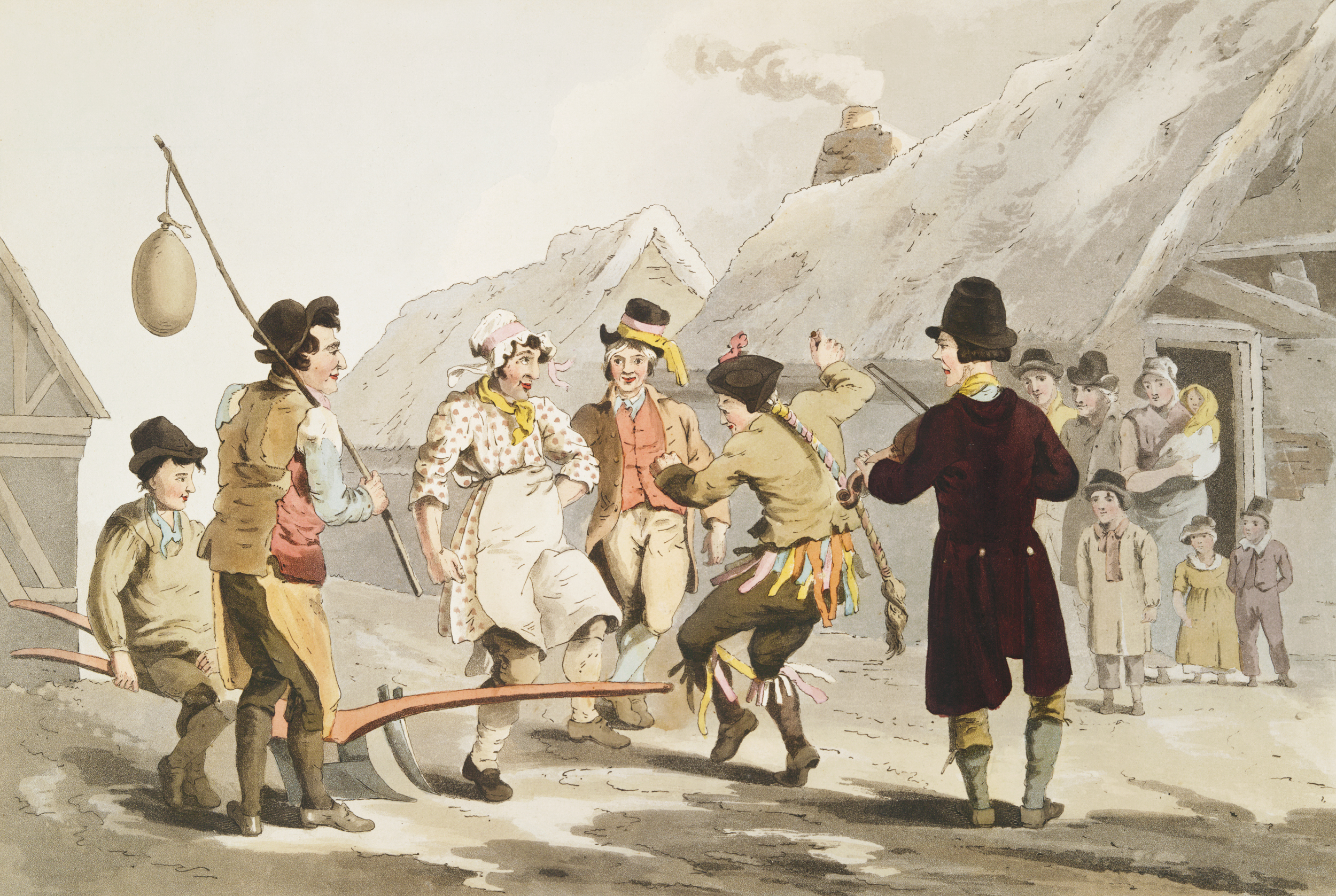
Plough Monday, from George Walker's The Costume of Yorkshire, 1814

Plough Monday is the traditional start of the English agricultural year. It is the first Monday after Epiphany, 6 January. In England, customs associated with the beginning of the ploughing season can be traced back to the medieval period, and by the mid-fifteenth century, they were generally observed on Plough Monday. Before the Reformation, parish churches lit candles called "plough lights" for farmworkers, and in some areas ploughs were taken around the parish to raise money for the church. After the Reformation, religious Plough Monday observances were suppressed, but private customs featuring house-visiting with a plough to collect money continued.

Plough Monday customs declined in the nineteenth century and died out in the early part of the twentieth century, partly due to social changes driven by increased industrialisation and the advent of mechanised farming, and partly due to pressure from the authorities. Various Plough Monday customs have since been revived. As early as 1923 the Goathland Plough Stots, a north Yorkshire longsword dance team, was revived under the influence of Cecil Sharp; since the second British folk revival in the 1960s and 1970s East Anglian Plough Monday customs such as molly dancing and the Whittlesea Straw Bear have also been revived.

== History ==
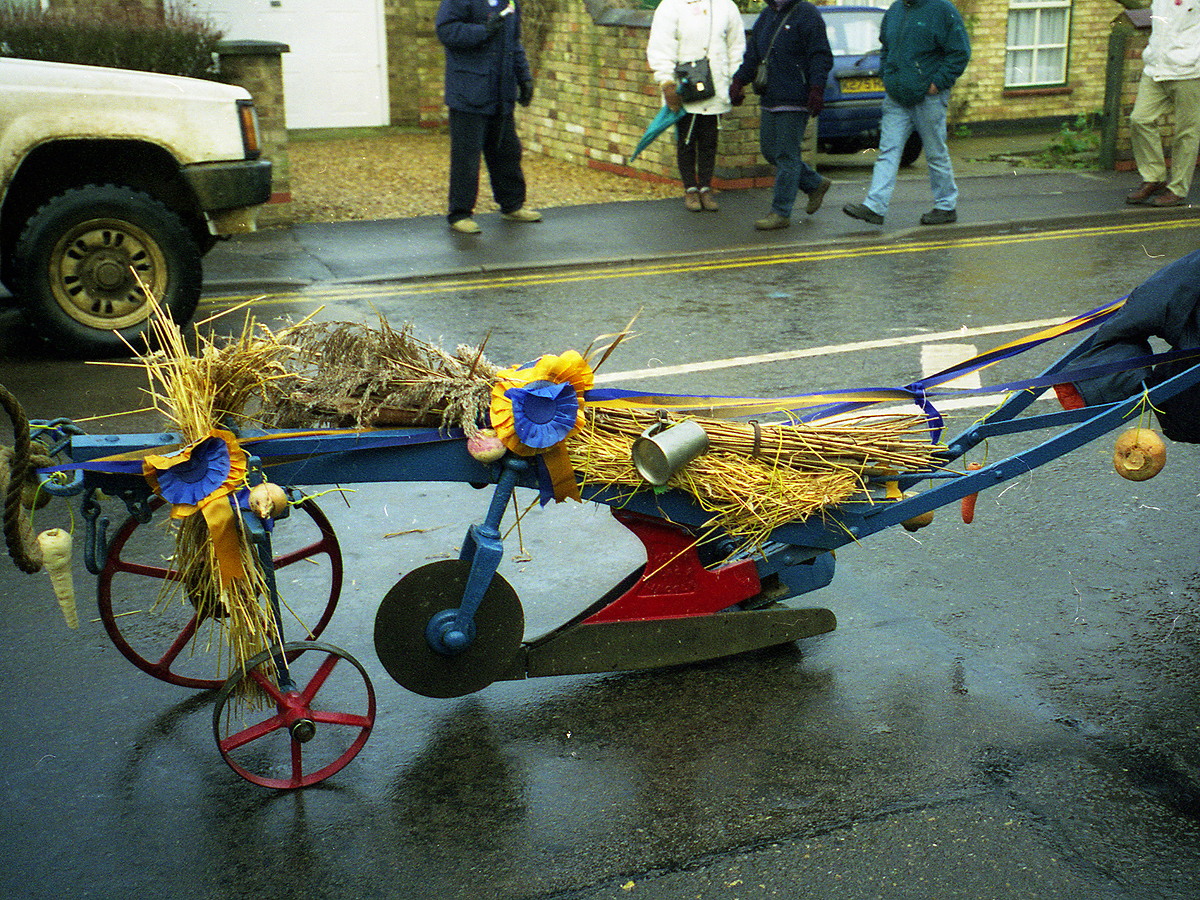
A plough being pulled through the streets of Whittlesey as part of the Whittlesey Straw Bear Festival procession. Ploughs were traditionally taken around by Plough Monday mummers and molly dancers in parts of eastern England and in some places were used as a threat: if householders refused to donate to the participants their front path would be ploughed up.

Plough Monday was usually celebrated on the first Monday after Twelfth Night, (Note: In some areas, it was the second, or less often the first, Monday in January) and marked the beginning of the ploughing season and the start of the agricultural year in England. Customs associated with the beginning of the ploughing season are known from the medieval period – for example a plough race on 7 January was held at Carlton in Lindrick in Nottinghamshire in the late thirteenth century. By the mid-fifteenth century, these celebrations were generally observed on Plough Monday. The earliest source known to name the day Plough Monday comes from Cambridgeshire in 1529.

In the fifteenth century, churches lit candles called "plough lights" to bless farmworkers. Some parishes kept a plough in the church for those who did not own one, and in some parishes, the plough was paraded around the village to raise money for the church. This practice seems to have died out after the Reformation. Plough lights were effectively banned in 1538 as a consequence of an injunction against unnecessary candles in churches, and though there was a partial revival of the practice under Mary I, by the end of the Elizabethan period the religious celebration of Plough Monday had ceased.

While religious Plough Monday celebrations were suppressed, private observances continued. The most common custom involved dragging a plough and collecting money. Where the pre-Reformation plough lights were geographically restricted to Lincolnshire, Northamptonshire and East Anglia, by the late eighteenth century plough-dragging customs were also attested in the north-eastern counties of Yorkshire, Derbyshire, and Northumberland. The Plough Monday celebrants were known by a variety of regional names, including Plough Boys, Bullocks, Lads, Jacks, Stots, and Witches. The Plough Boys usually dressed in costume, often with one or more in female clothing.

Though mostly associated with the east of England, Plough Monday celebrations are also known elsewhere in the country, for instance in Warwickshire, Worcestershire, and Cornwall. The customs observed on Plough Monday varied by region, but a common feature to a lesser or greater extent was for a plough (known variously as the "fond plough", "fool plough", "stot plough", or "white plough") to be hauled from house to house in a procession, collecting money. They were often accompanied by musicians, an old woman or a boy dressed as an old woman, called the "Bessy", and a man in the role of the "fool". In Leicestershire, Lincolnshire, Nottinghamshire, and Rutland, a kind of Mummers' play called a Plough Play was performed.

== Modern observances ==
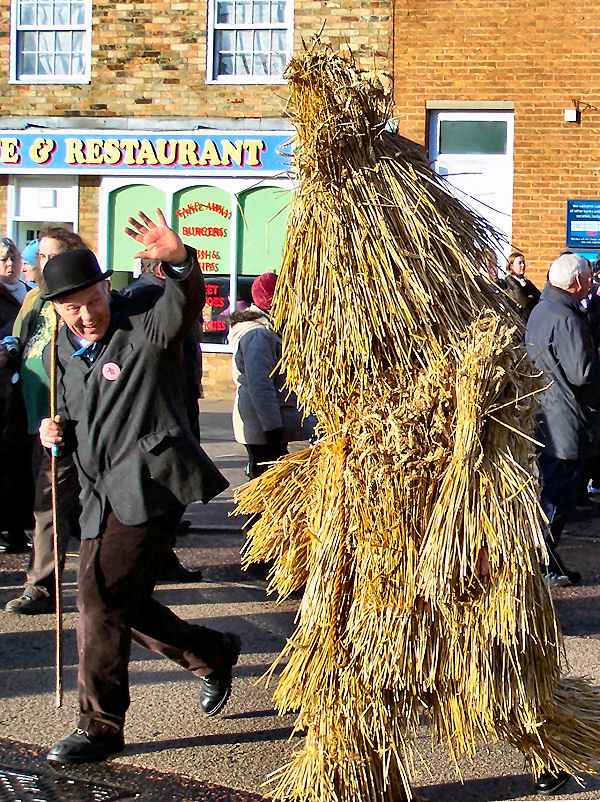
Whittlesey Straw Bear

Plough Monday customs declined in the 19th century. The advent of mechanised farming meant that agricultural workers were less numerous and relatively better paid, and thus did not have to beg for money in the winter. Additionally, the rowdy and threatening behaviour of the plough gangs was increasingly controversial in this period, and there was pressure from authorities to stop, or moderate their excesses. Though some Plough Monday customs continued into the 1930s, they did not continue past the beginning of the Second World War.

Following the Second World War, the Church of England and members of the Royal Agricultural Society of England attempted to revive Plough Sunday, the day before Plough Monday, as a Christian feast, although there is little evidence that it was historically so celebrated. These efforts were largely unsuccessful. From the 1960s, Plough Monday customs began to be revived following the second British folk revival. In 1972, the tradition of traveling around the village with a plough to collect money was revived at Balsham in Cambridgeshire. Subsequently, the Cambridge Morris Men revived the practice of Plough Monday molly dancing in 1977.

=== Whittlesey Straw Bear festival ===
In the Cambridgeshire villages of Ramsey and Whittlesey during the nineteenth century, on Plough Monday or Tuesday men or boys would dress in a layer of straw and were known as straw bears, who went door to door dancing for money. The tradition died out around the time of the First World War. In 1980 the straw bear tradition was revived at Whittlesey, inspired in part by Ashley Hutchings' album Rattlebone and Ploughjack, which included G. C. Moore Smith's 1909 description of the custom. The revived tradition is now part of the Straw Bear Festival, held every year on the nearest Saturday to Plough Monday, which features a procession of the straw bear, a ploughgang, and molly and morris dance teams. In 2009, a straw bear was also revived at Ramsey, where schoolchildren recreate the bear on Plough Monday.

=== Goathland Plough Stots ===
In the village of Goathland in North Yorkshire, Plough Monday was traditionally celebrated with a plough procession, mummers' play, and sword dancing. In 1913 Cecil Sharp visited Goathland but was unable to find anyone who remembered the sword dance, last performed around 1868. Inspired by Sharp's work, the dance was revived for Plough Monday in 1923. Since the revival the sword dance has become the main feature of the tradition, and continues to be performed on the Saturday following Plough Monday. Money collected by the sword dancers at Goathland was originally used to buy food and drink for the "finish-up feast" at the end of the celebration; more recently it has been donated to the local hospital and lifeboat station.

== See also ==
- Distaff Day, 7 January, the day that household work traditionally resumed after the Christmas season
- Hobby horse#Plough Monday mummers
- Mummers' play#Local seasonal variants
- Royal Ploughing Ceremony, a royal rite in mainland Southeast Asia
- Plugușorul, a Romanian ploughing celebration on Saint Basil's Eve (New Year's Eve)
