= Manuscripts in the Biblioteca Marciana =

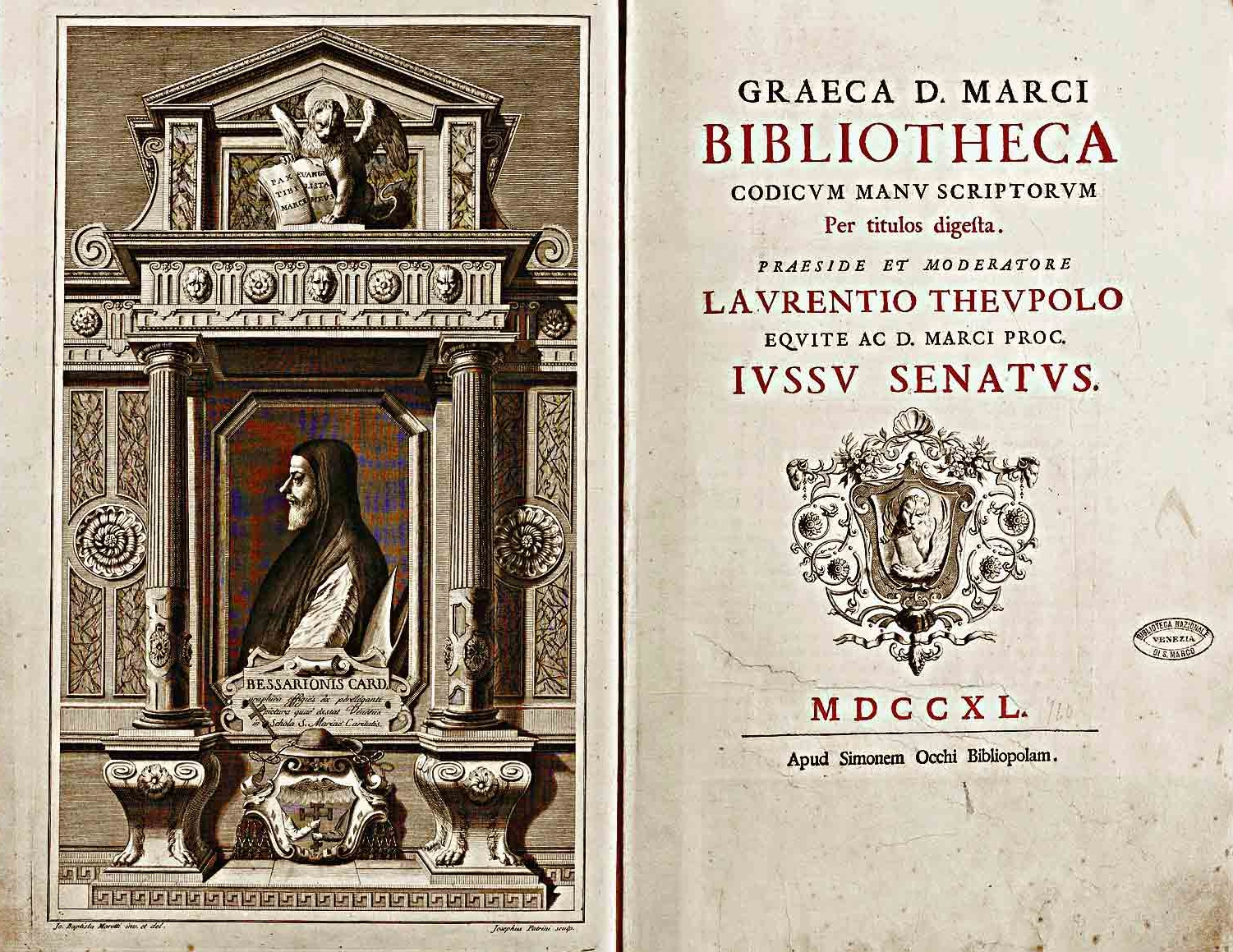

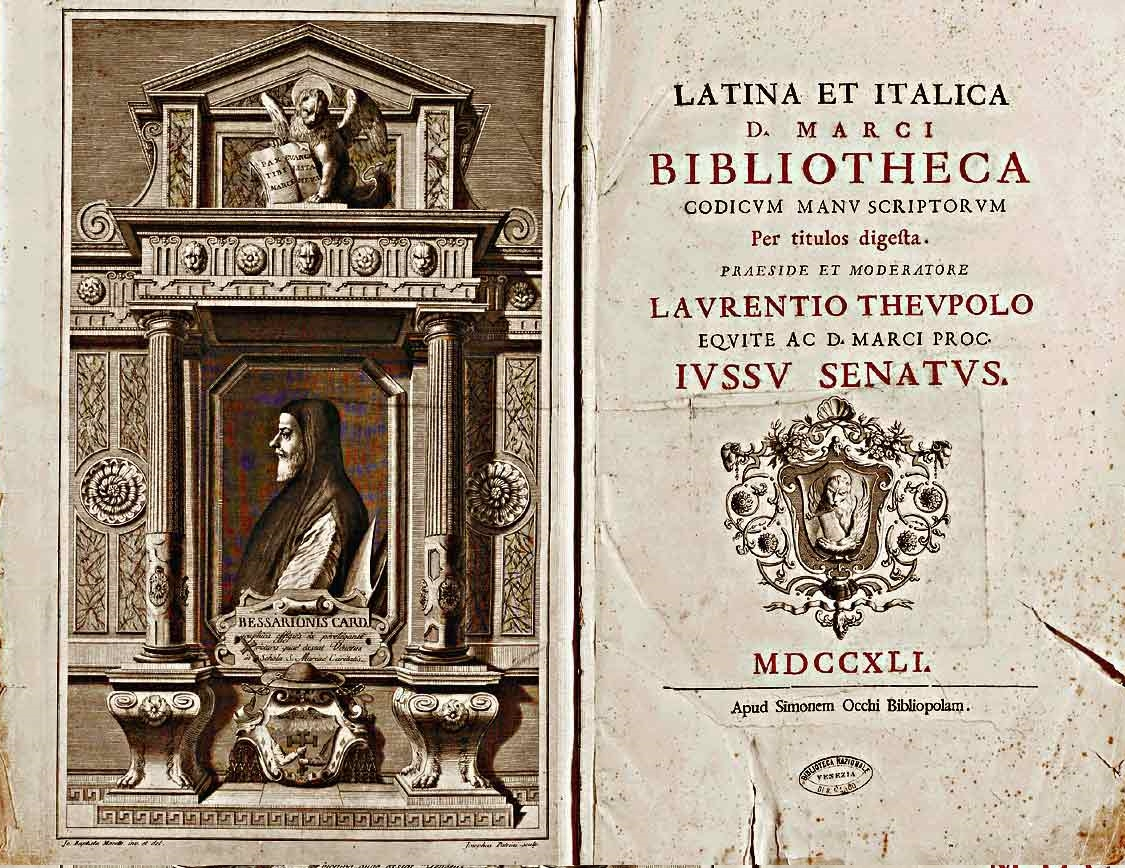
The catalogues of the library, compiled by Antonio Maria Zanetti and Antonio Bongiovanni and published in 1740 and 1741

The collection of the Marciana Library contains 4,639 manuscripts and 13,117 manuscript volumes. Its historical nucleus is the private collection of Cardinal Bessarion, which was donated to the Republic of Venice in 1468.

== Manuscripts ==
Some significant manuscripts in the collection include:

Greek

- Gr. Z. 196 (=743): commentary by Olympiodorus on Plato's Gorgias and Alcibiades (ninth century) on-line
- Gr. Z. 228 (=406): includes Books I and II of Peri Psychēs by Aristotle with commentary by Simplicius of Cilicia and Sophonias and paraphrases by Themistius together with commentary by Pseudo-Diadochus on Plato's Timaeus, commentary by Simplicius of Cilicia on Aristotle's Peri Ouranoû, commentary by Ammonius Hermiae’s on Plato's Phaedrus, and commentary by Proclus on Plato's Parmenides. (fourteenth century) on-line
- Gr. Z. 313 (=690): Mathematiké sýntaxis by Ptolemy (tenth century)
- Gr. Z. 388 (=333): Geōgraphikḕ Hyphḗgēsis by Ptolemy with 27 map projections, commissioned by Bessarion and attributed to John Rhosos (fifteenth century)
- Gr. Z. 395 (=921): Romaiki istoria by Cassius Dio, the oldest manuscript containing Books XLIV, 35, 4–LX, 28, 3 (ninth century)
- Gr. Z. 447 (=820): Deipnosophistaí by Athenaeus of Naucratis, the oldest surviving and most complete extant text (tenth century) on-line
- Gr. Z. 453 (=821): "Homerus Venetus B" (eleventh century) on-line
- Gr. Z. 454 (=822): "Homerus Venetus A", text of Homer's Iliás epic with annotations, glosses, and commentaries (tenth century) on-line
- Gr. Z. 460 (=330): commentary on Homer's Odýsseia by Eustathius of Thessalonica, autograph copy (twelfth century)
- Gr. Z. 479 (=881): Cynegetica by Oppian of Apamea and Vita Oppiani by Constantine Manasses, the oldest illustrated version with 150 miniatures (eleventh century)
- Gr. Z. 481 (=863): Anthologia Planudea, autograph copy of Greek epigrams by Maximus Planudes (1299–1301) on-line

Italian

- It. VIII, 2 (=2796): De architectura by Antonio Averulino, commissioned for Matthias Corvinus and illustrated with 152 designs (fifteenth century) on-line
- It. IX, 276 (=6902): Divina Commedia by Dante Alighieri, illuminated with 170 miniatures (fourteenth century) on-line

Latin

- Lat. Z. 549 (=1597): "Codex Cumanicus", handbook of the Cuman language for missionaries with glossaries and a collection of religious texts, linguistic data, and folkloric materials (fourteenth century) on-line
- Lat. I, 99 (=2138): "Breviarium Grimani", Breviary illuminated by the Flemish miniaturists Gerard Horenbout and Alexander and Simon Bening, once belonging to Cardinal Domenico Grimani (c. 1515–1520) on-line
- Lat. I, 103 (=11925): "Evangelistarium Grimani", Gospel illuminated by Benedetto Bordone and Giulio Clovio for Cardinal Marino Grimani (1528) on-line
- Lat. VI, 86 (=2593): De remediis by Francesco Petrarch and Cato Maior de senectute by Cicero (fourteenth century)
- Lat. VI, 254 (=2976): Historia naturalis by Pliny the Elder, illuminated copy commissioned by Pico della Mirandola (1481)
- Lat. XII, 68 (=4519): De bello punico by Silius Italicus, illuminated by Zanobi Strozzi and Francesco Pesellino (fifteenth century) on-line
- Lat. XIV, 35 (=4054): De nuptiis Philologiae et Mercurii by Martianus Capella, illuminated by Attavante degli Attavanti for Matthias Corvinus (fifteenth century) on-line

Oriental languages

- Or. 90 (= 57): İskendernâme by Taceddin İbrahim bin Hizir Ahmedî, illuminated Ottoman version of the Alexander Romance (fifteenth century)

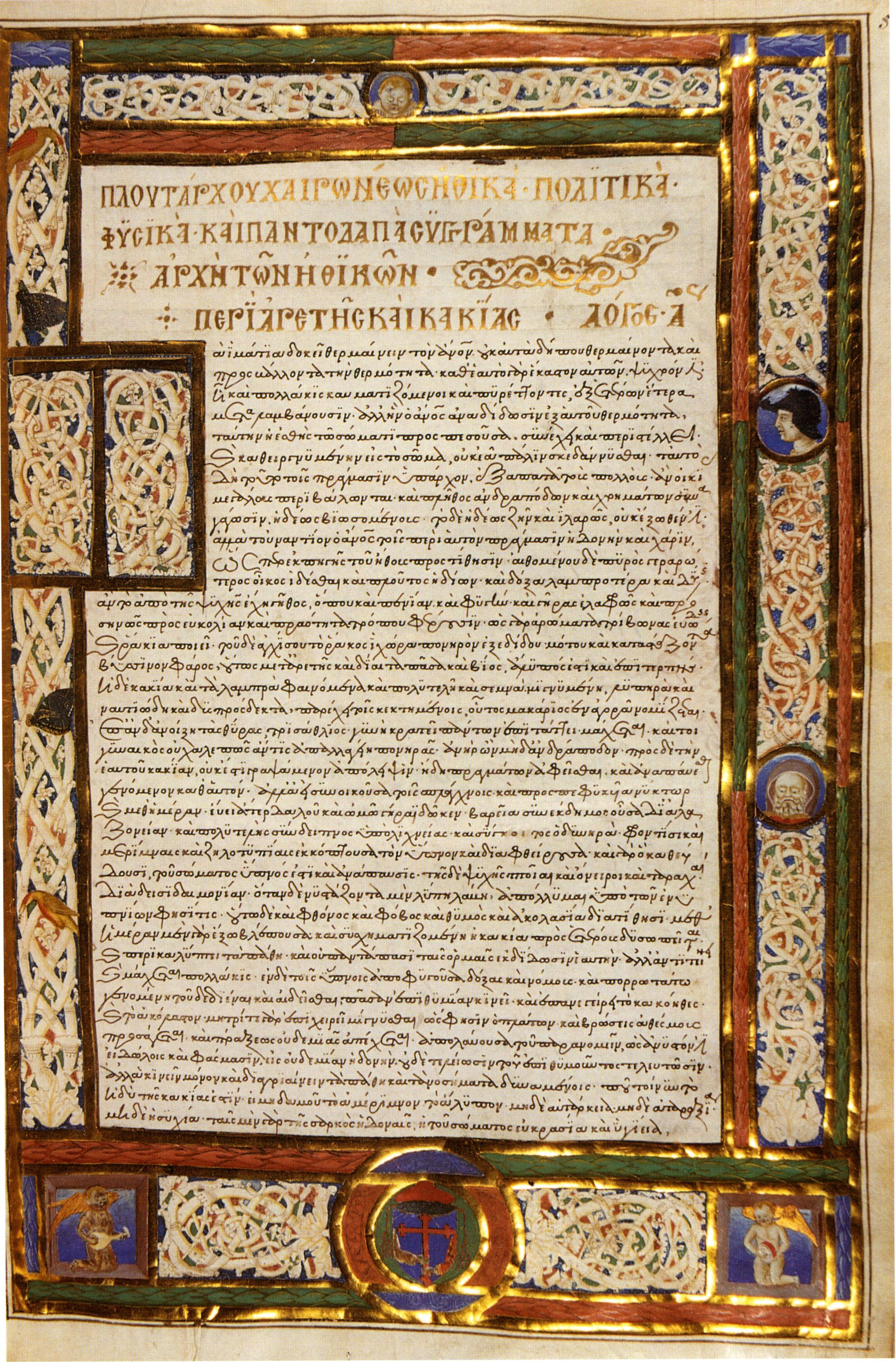
Plutarch, Ēthika
Gr. Z. 248 (=328), fol. 5r.

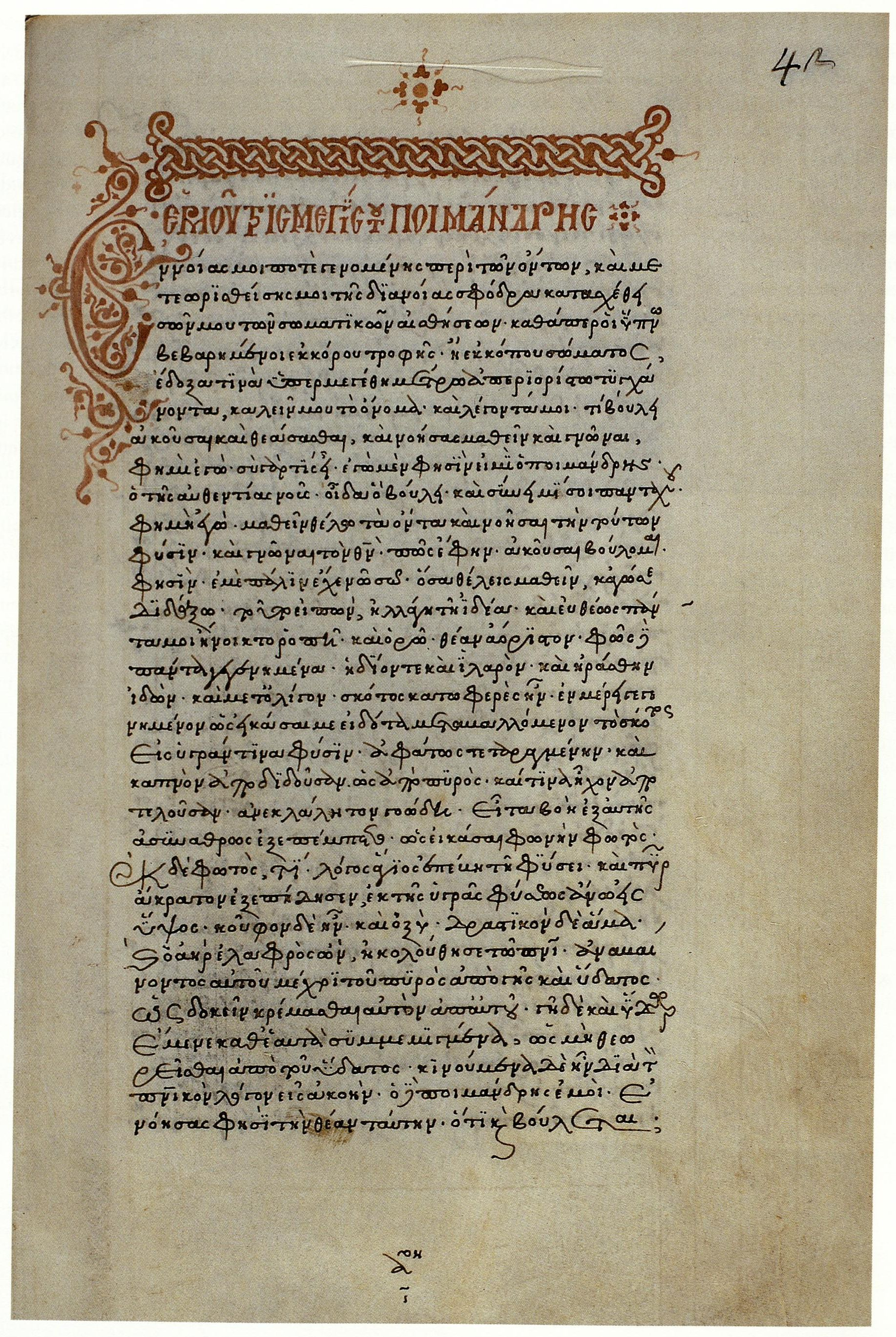
Poimandres (Corpus Hermeticum)
Gr. Z. 263 (=1025), fol. 42r.

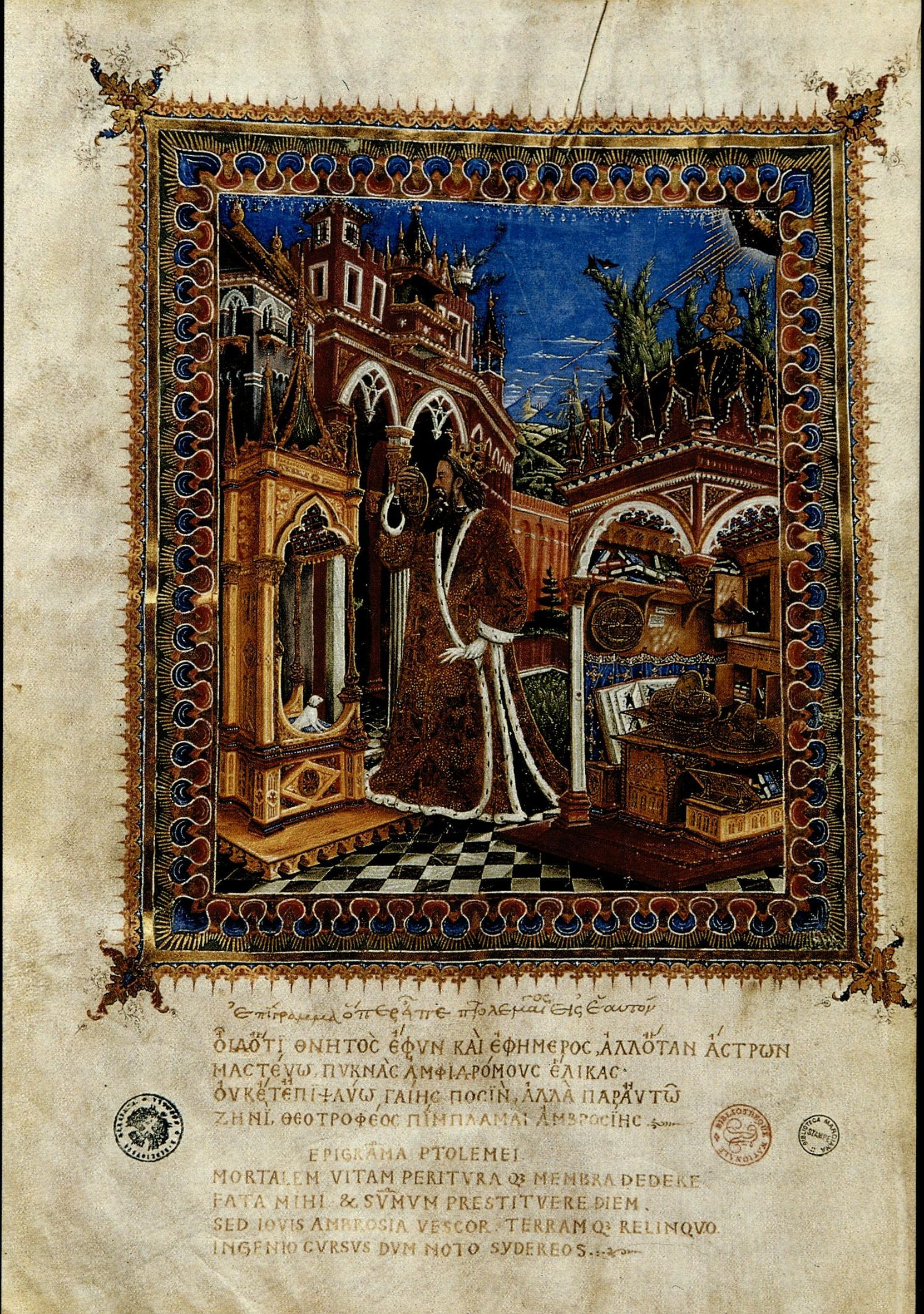
Ptolemy, Geōgraphikḕ Hyphḗgēsis
Gr. Z. 388 (=333), fol. 6v.

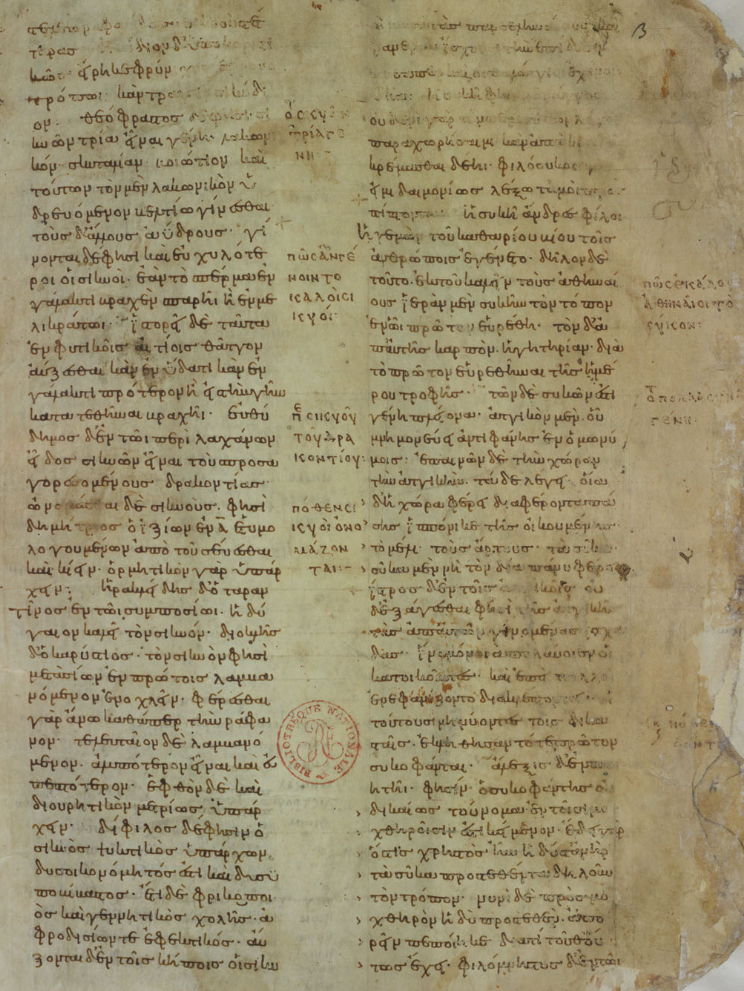
Athenaeus, Deipnosophistaí
Gr. Z. 447 (=820), fol. 1r.

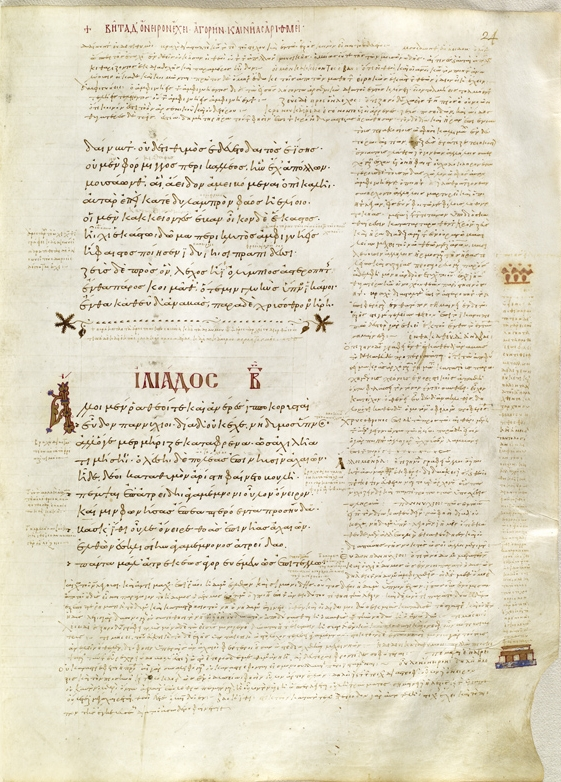
"Homerus Venetus A"
Gr. Z. 454 (=822), fol. 24r.

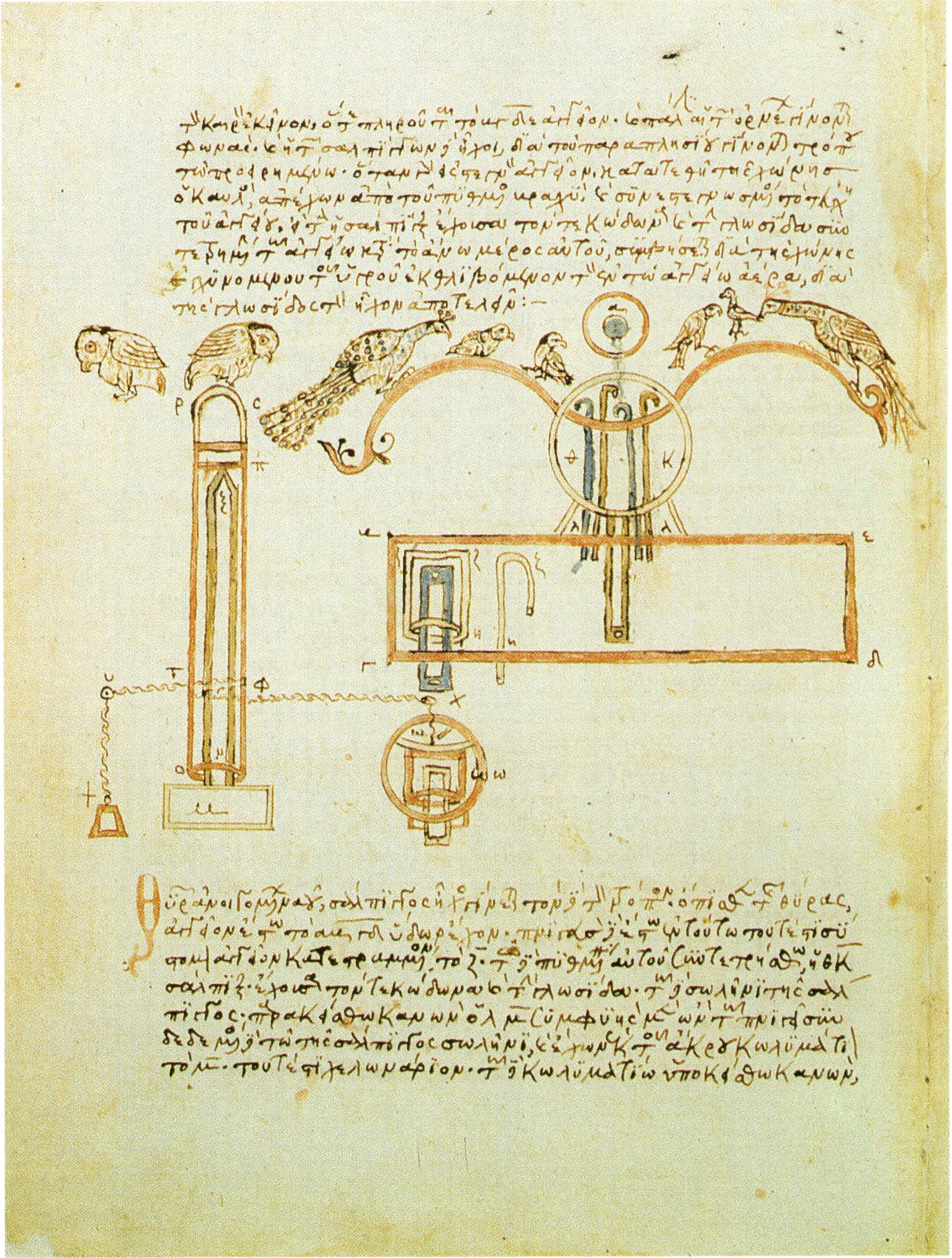
Hero of Alexandria, Pneumatica
Gr. Z. 516 (=904), fol. 172v.

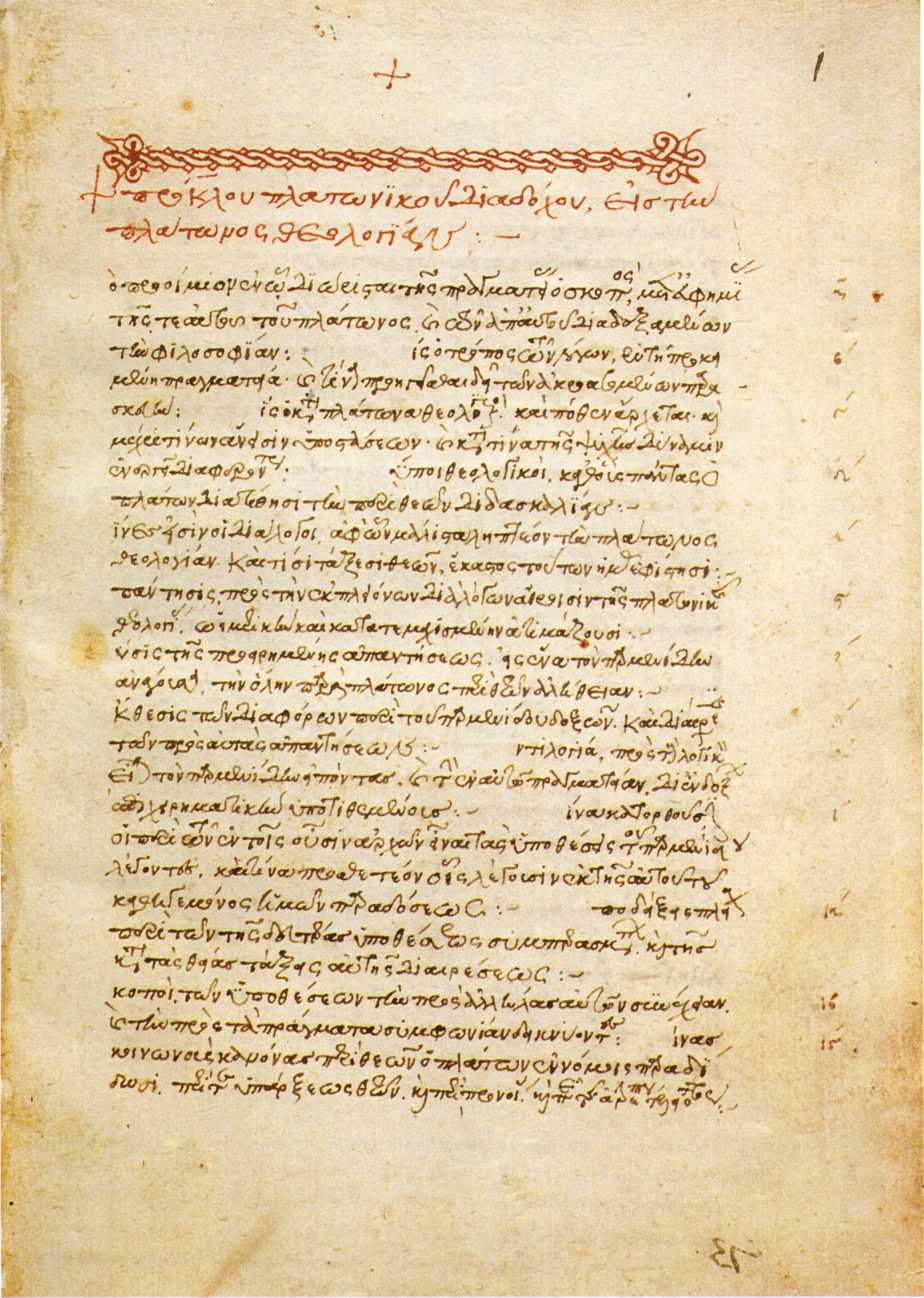
Proclus, Theologia Platonica
Gr. Z. 547 (=411), fol. 1r.

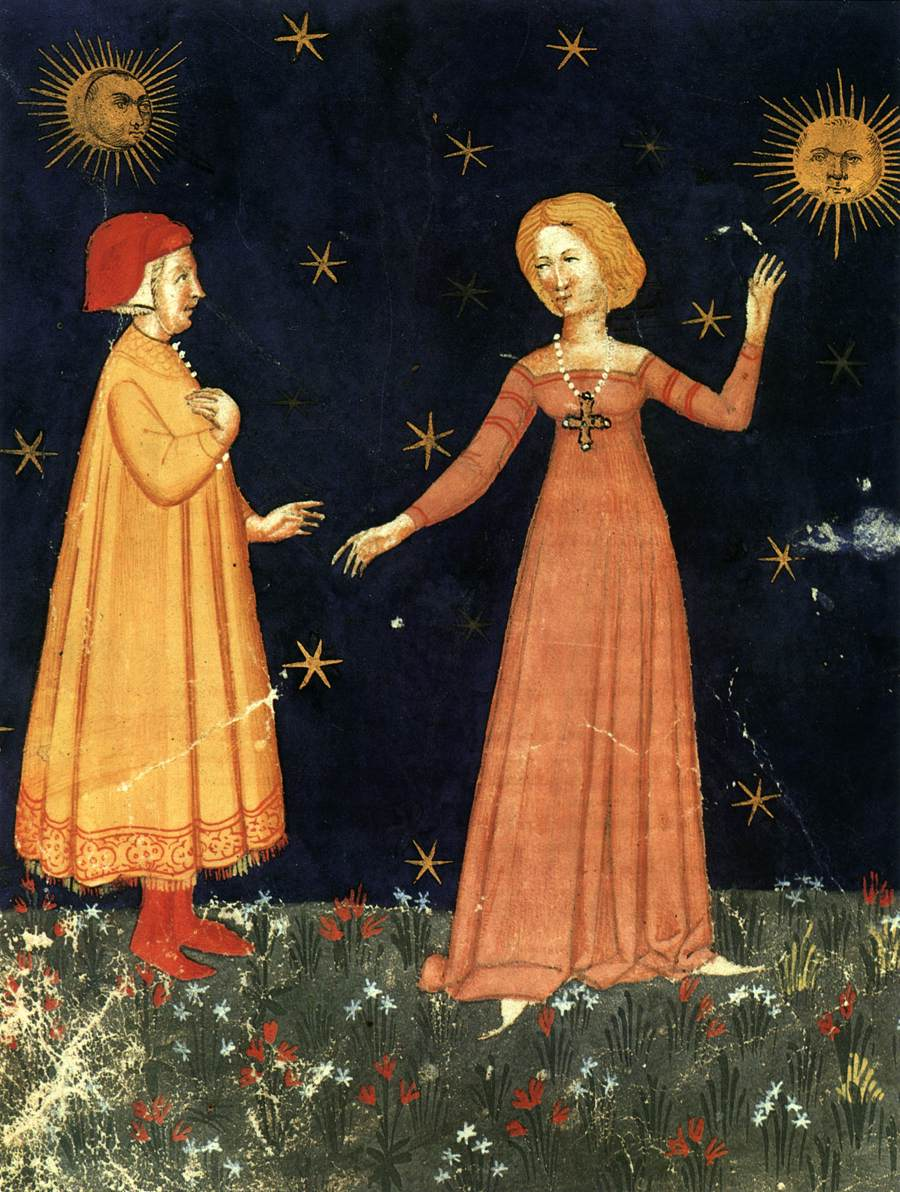
Dante, Divina Commedia
It. IX, 276 (=6902), fol. 53v.

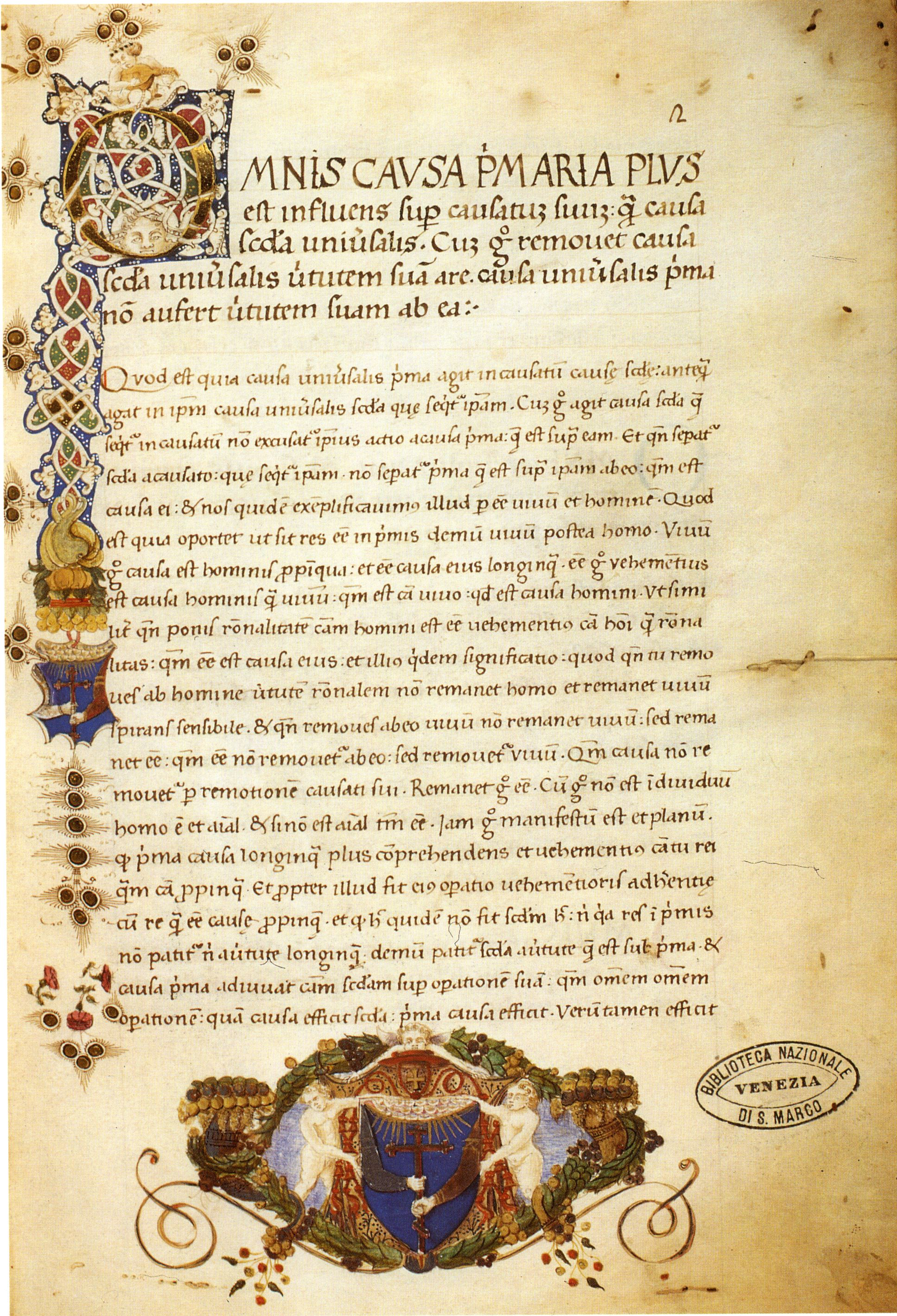
Pseudo-Aristotle, Liber de causis
Lat. Z. 288 (=913), fol. 2r.

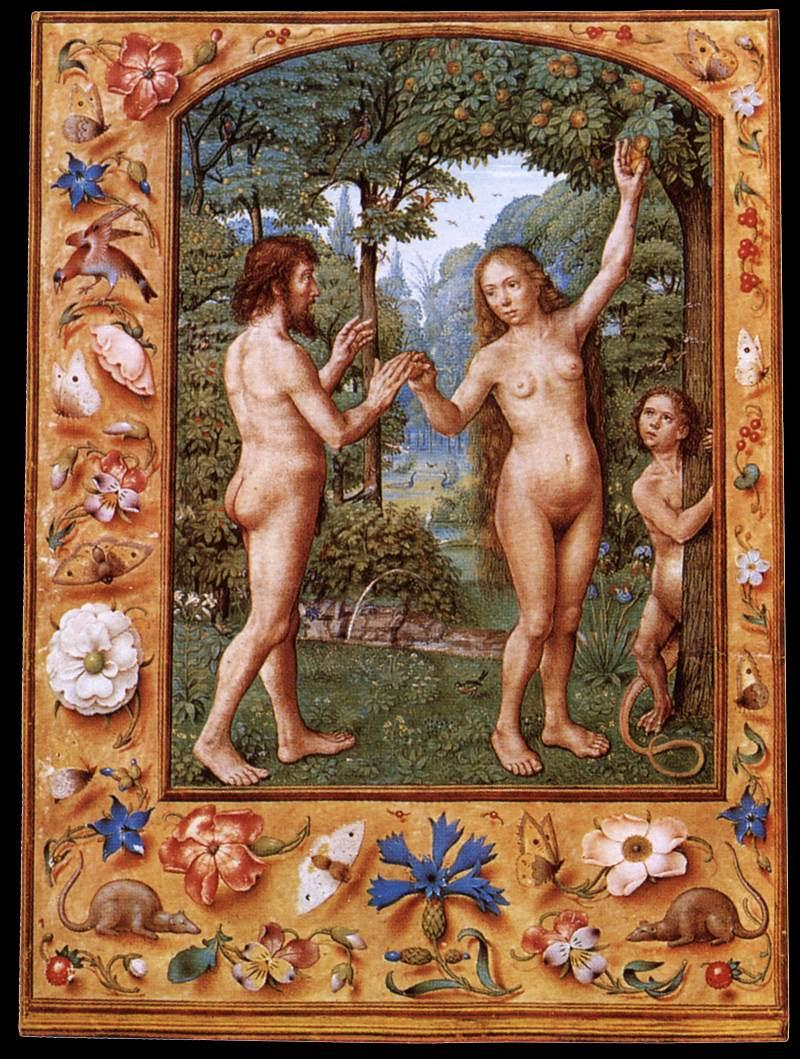
Breviarum Grimani
Lat. I, 99 (=2138), fol. 286v.

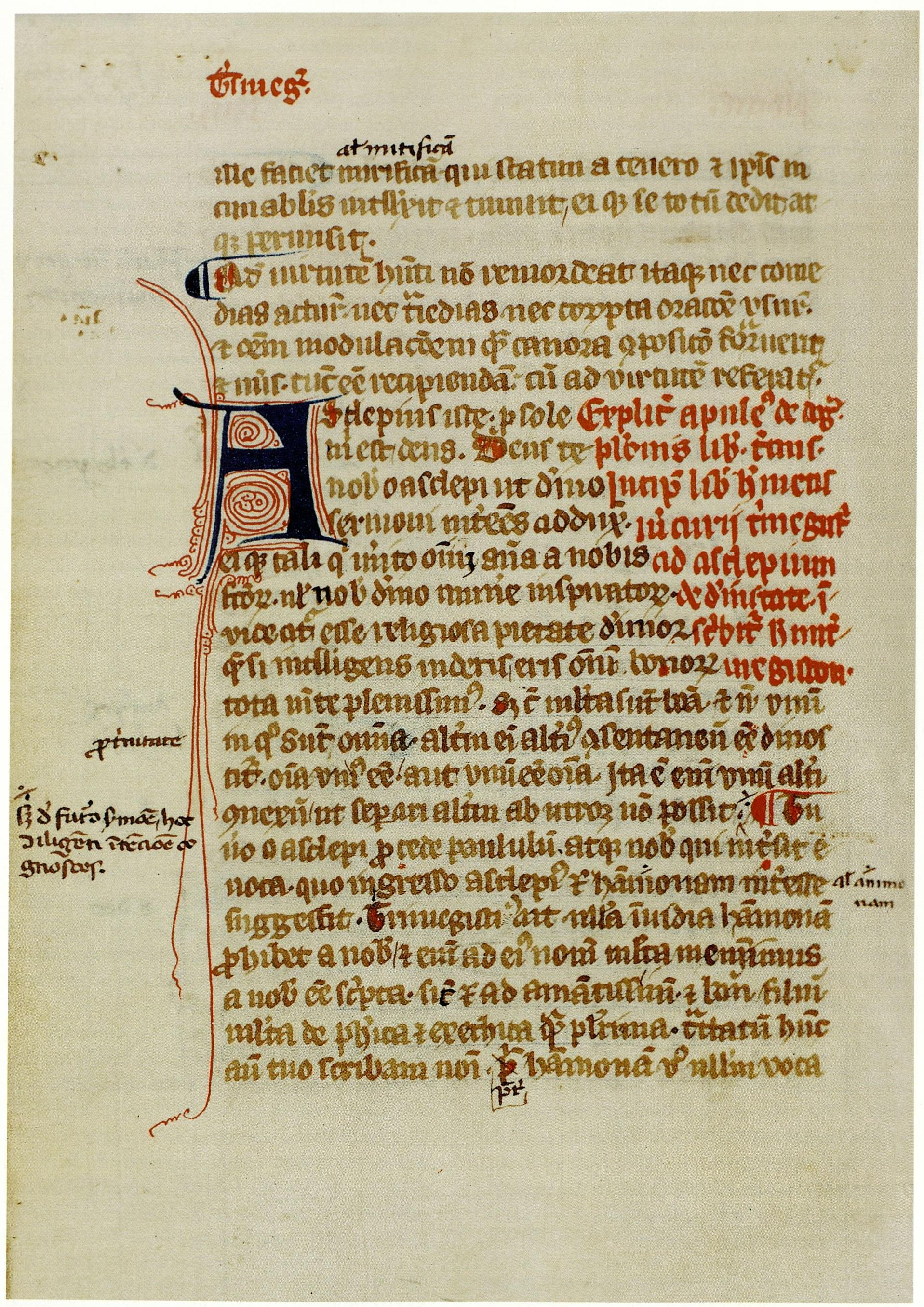
Asclepius (Corpus Hermeticum)
Lat. VI, 81 (= 3036), fol. 131v.

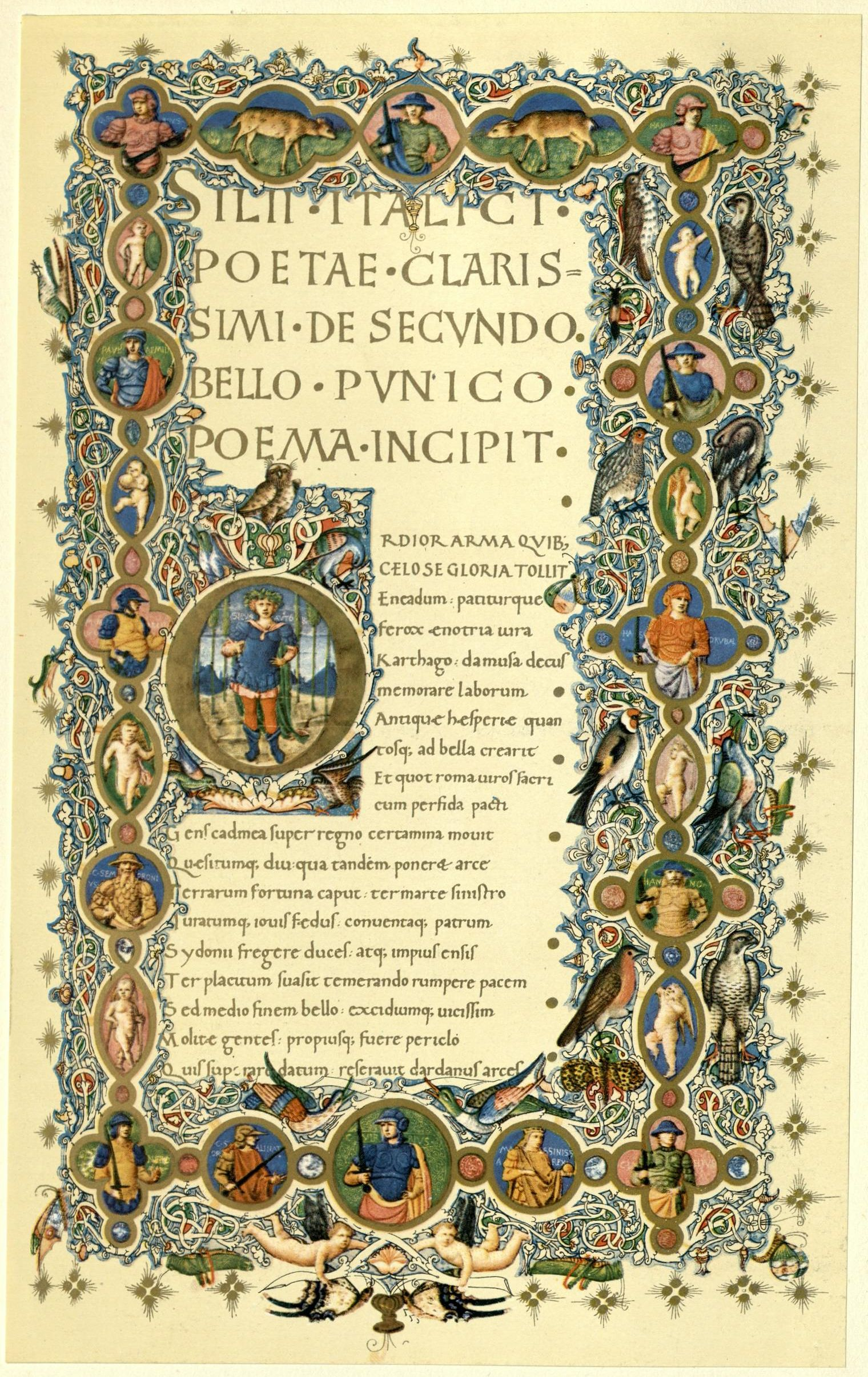
Silius Italicus, De bello punico
Lat. XII, 68 (=4519), fol. 3r.

== Biblical manuscripts ==
Old Testament

- Gr. Z. 1 (=320): Old Testament (beginning with the Book of Job), companion to the Vatican codice Vat. Gr. 2106 (eighth century) on-line
- Gr. Z. 17 (=421): "Psalmi cum catena", the 150 Psalms with commentary and illustrations, (tenth-early eleventh century) on-line
- Gr. Z. 538 (=540): "Catena in Job", text of the Book of Job with catena and 30 miniatures (905)

New Testament

- Uncial 030
- Uncial 0243
- Minuscule 205
- Minuscule 207
- Minuscule 208
- Minuscule 209
- Minuscule 210
- Minuscule 211
- Minuscule 212
- Minuscule 213
- Minuscule 214
- Minuscule 215
- Minuscule 217
- Minuscule 354
- Minuscule 355
- Minuscule 357
- Minuscule 405
- Minuscule 406
- Minuscule 407
- Minuscule 408
- Minuscule 409
- Minuscule 410
- Minuscule 411
- Minuscule 412
- Minuscule 413
- Minuscule 414
- Minuscule 415
- Minuscule 416
- Minuscule 417
- Minuscule 418
- Minuscule 419
- Minuscule 599
- Minuscule 891
- Minuscule 893
- Lectionary 107
- Lectionary 108
- Lectionary 109
- Lectionary 110
- Lectionary 139
- Lectionary 140
- Lectionary 141
- Lectionary 142
- Lectionary 264
- Lectionary 265
- Lectionary 266
- Lectionary 267
- Lectionary 268
- Lectionary 269

== Cartography ==
- Fra Mauro map
- It. Z. 76 (=4783): "Bianco world map", nautical atlas by Andrea Bianco with eight portolan charts and two world maps (1436) on-line
- It. VI, 213 (=5982): "Corbitis Atlas" (early fifteenth century) on-line

== Music manuscripts ==
There are some important music manuscripts. The composers represented include:

- Francesco Cavalli operas (from the collection of mostly Venetian opera manuscripts amassed by Marco Contarini, which was donated to the Biblioteca Marciana in 1843). Works include La Calisto (1651) and Erismena (1655, 1670).
- Domenico Scarlatti keyboard sonatas (volumes acquired from the singer Farinelli).
