= E. C. Cawte =

English folklorist (1932–2019)

Edwin Christopher Cawte (3 September 1932 – 27 July 2019) was an English folklorist. While at university, he became interested in English folk dance, joining a morris side and beginning to research rapper dance. He later collaborated with Alex Helm, Norman Peacock and Roger Marriott in researching English folk traditions; out of this collaboration came joint publications on ceremonial dance and drama. After the death of Helm, Cawte published the monograph Ritual Animal Disguise. He was also an important figure in the revival of the border morris tradition.

== Life ==
Edwin Christopher Cawte was born in Boscombe, a suburb of Bournemouth in Dorset, England; his family soon moved to Gosforth, Newcastle upon Tyne. He was educated at Salisbury Cathedral School and Cranleigh School, and from 1951 studied medicine at King's College, Durham, then part of the University of Durham but now Newcastle University.

After he graduated, Cawte served in the Royal Army Medical Corps from 1957 to 1959 as National Service. After leaving the army he practiced medicine in Newcastle and Yorkshire, before moving to Leicestershire in 1961 where he was a general practitioner until he retired in 1992. In 1960 he married Betty Horne, whom he had met while at university; the couple had four children. Cawte died in 2019 and was buried at the Church of St Mary and St Hardulph, Breedon on the Hill.

== Folklorist ==
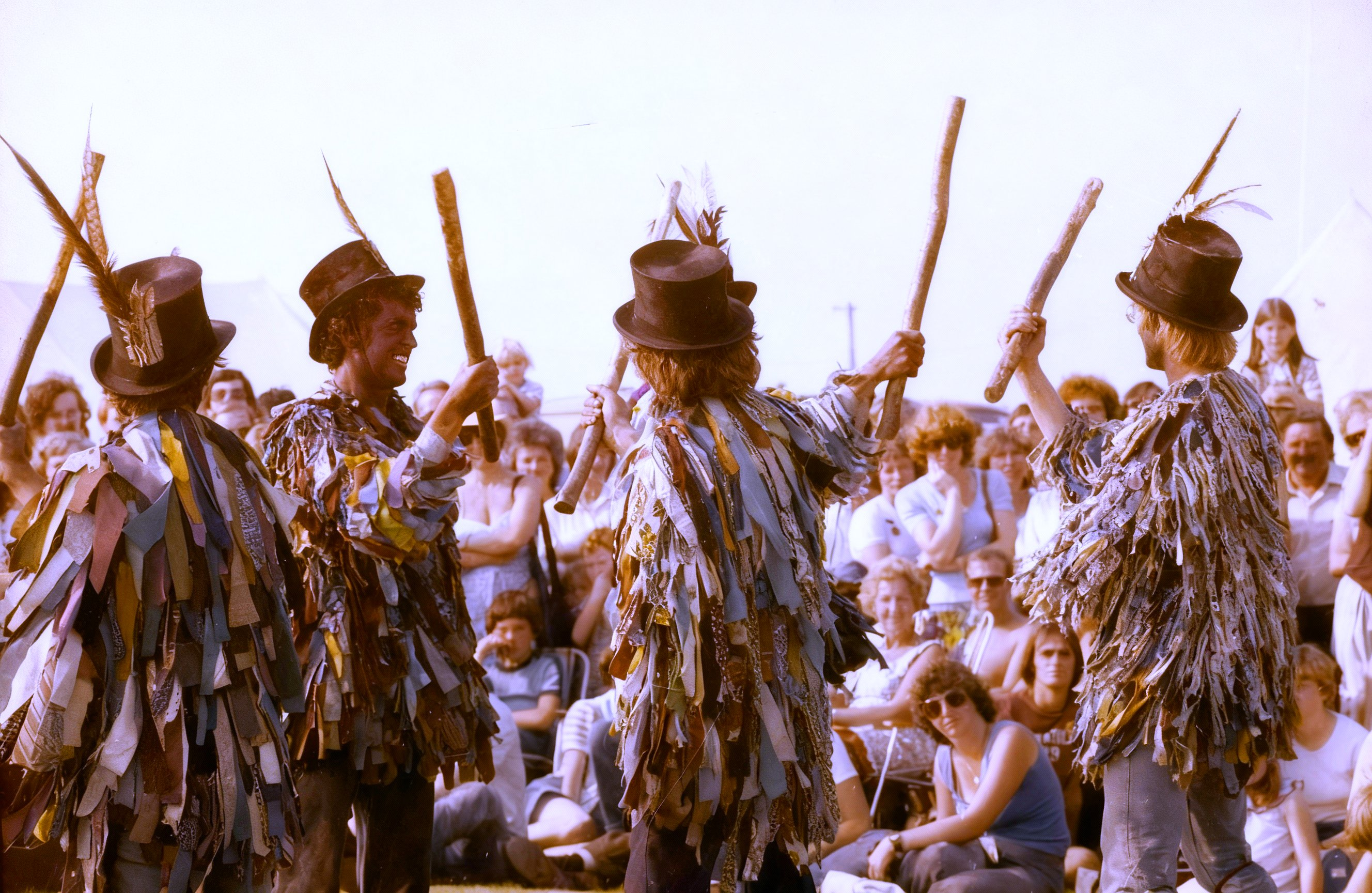
The Shropshire Bedlams border morris side performing in 1980. Cawte was an important figure in the border morris revival.

Cawte showed a musical talent from an early age. While at Salisbury he was a chorister, and he held a music scholarship at Cranleigh; he also learnt to play the pipe and violin from his mother as a child. At university he played for a university morris dance side, the King's College Morris Men, and in the 1960s was part of the Leicester Morris Men.

While at university, Cawte became interested in rapper dance, which he began to research. He subsequently collaborated with Alex Helm, Norman Peacock and Roger Marriott to research English folk traditions. In 1960 they published an index of English ceremonial dance traditions in the Journal of the English Folk Dance and Song Society, and in 1967 Helm, Cawte, and Peacock published the book English Ritual Drama. Their work helped overturn the previously-accepted theory that traditional drama was the continuation of a pre-Christian fertility ritual. Cawte continued to develop the index after the publication of English Ritual Drama, and Helm's death in 1970, publishing corrections and additions in the newsletter of the Traditional Drama Research Group.

Cawte published Ritual Animal Disguise in 1978. He also published articles on morris and rapper dance, and self-published booklets with Alex Helm on sword dance and mumming. Cawte coined the term border morris, and was an important figure in its revival. He was part of the editorial board of the Folk Music Journal from 1975 until 2018.

In 2002 Cawte was awarded the English Folk Dance and Song Society's Gold Badge. He donated his manuscripts and many books to the Vaughan Williams Memorial Library.

== Select bibliography ==
- "Geographical Index of the Ceremonial Dance in Great Britain: Part One". Journal of the English Folk Dance and Song Society. 1960.
- "Geographical Index of the Ceremonial Dance in Great Britain: Addenda and Corrigenda". Journal of the English Folk Dance and Song Society. 1961.
- "The Morris Dance in Herefordshire, Shropshire and Worcestershire". Journal of the English Folk Dance and Song Society. 1963.
- English Ritual Drama: A Geographical Index. 1967.
- Ritual Animal Disguise. 1978.
- "A History of the Rapper Dance". Folk Music Journal. 1981.

== Works cited ==
- Cass, Eddie (2011). "Alex Helm (1920–1970) and His Collection of Folk Performance Material". Folklore.
- Cawte, Betty; Cawte, David (2020). "Edwin Christopher Cawte". British Medical Journal. 368. JSTOR 27232797.
- Heaney, Michael (2020). "Christopher Cawte (1932–2019)". Folklore. 131. doi:10.1080/0015587X.2019.1699752.
- Schofield, Derek (2021). "Edwin Christopher Cawte (1932–2019)". Folk Music Journal. 12 (1). JSTOR 45299313.
