= Lectionary 267 =

Lectionary ℓ 267
- New Testament manuscript
- Text: Evangelistarium
- Date: 1046
- Script: Greek
- Now at: Biblioteca Marciana
- Size: 33 cm by 26 cm
- Hand: beautiful

Lectionary 267, designated by siglum ℓ 267 (in the Gregory-Aland numbering) is a Greek manuscript of the New Testament, on parchment. It is dated by a colophon to the year 1046. Scrivener labelled it as 173^{e}, Gregory by 267^{e}. The manuscript is lacunose.

== Description ==
The codex contains lessons from the Gospel of John, Matthew, and Luke (Evangelistarium), with two lacunae at the beginning and end.

The text is written in Greek large minuscule letters, on 300 parchment leaves (33 cm by 26 cm), in two columns per page, 24 lines per page. Scrivener described it as "a grand cursive folio, sumptuously adorned". According to Gregory it is a beautiful manuscript.

The manuscript contains weekday Gospel lessons.

It contains text of John 8:3-11.

== History ==
The manuscript is dated by a colophon to the year 1046. It was written for the Church in Constantinople.

The manuscript was added to the list of New Testament manuscripts by Scrivener (number 173^{e}) and Gregory (number 267^{e}). Gregory saw the manuscript in 1886.

It was examined and described by Giovanni Luigi Mingarelli and Carlo Castellani.

The manuscript is not cited in the critical editions of the Greek New Testament (UBS3).

Currently the codex is housed at the Biblioteca Marciana (Gr. I.47 (978)) in Venice.

== See also ==
- List of New Testament lectionaries
- Biblical manuscript
- Textual criticism
- Lectionary 266

== Bibliography ==
- Gregory, Caspar René (1900). Textkritik des Neuen Testaments. Vol. 1. Leipzig: Hinrichs. p. 409.
