= Ordish =

Ordish is a surname. Notable people with the surname include:

- Frederick Webster Ordish (1821–1885), English architect
- Rowland Mason Ordish (1824–1886), English engineer
- T. Fairman Ordish (1855–1924), British folklorist

== Other uses ==
- Ordish-Lefeuvre system, a cable-stayed bridge design
