= Border Morris =

English folk dances

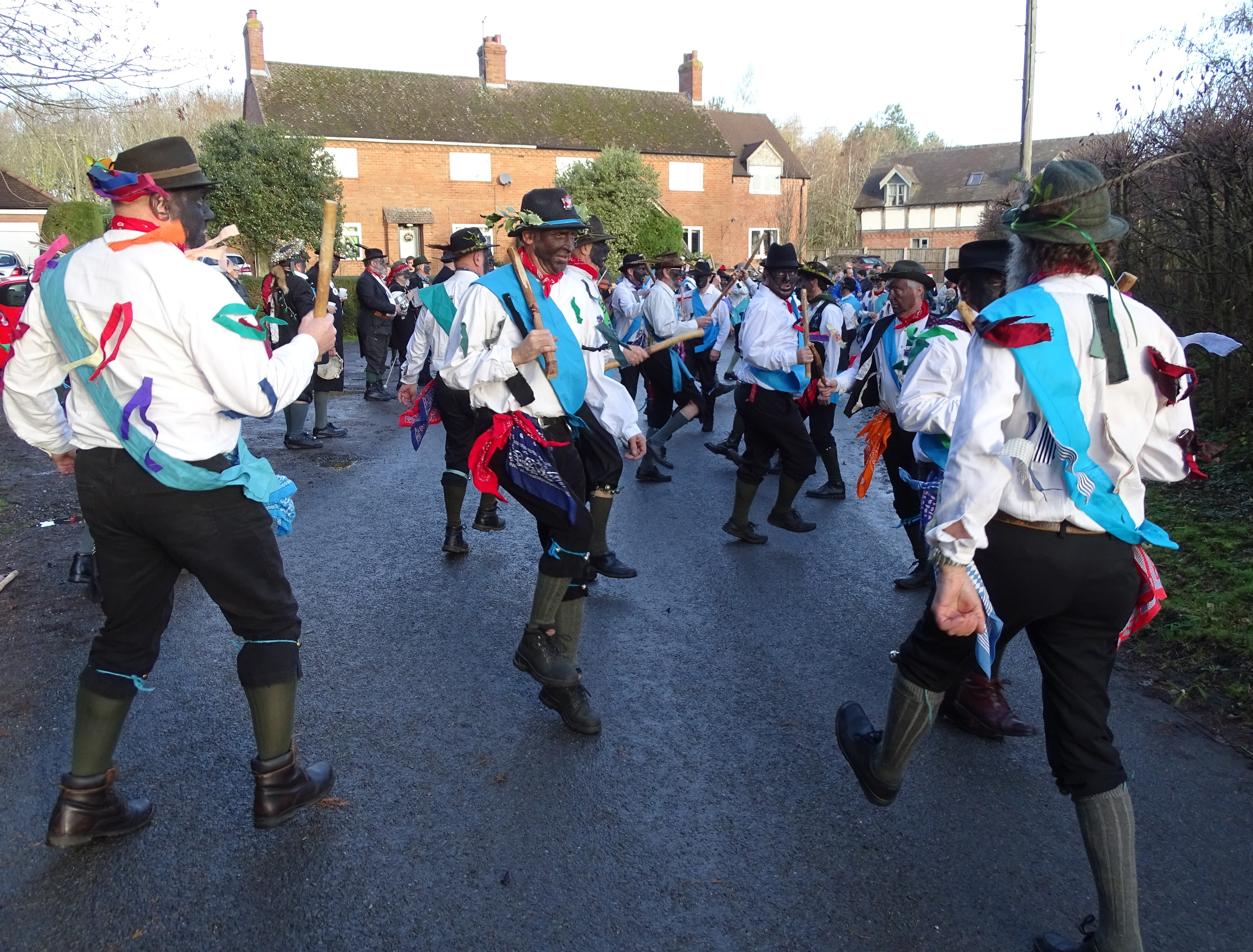
Border morris dancers, White Ladies Aston

Border Morris is a collection of individual local dances from villages along the English side of the Wales–England border in the counties of Herefordshire, Worcestershire and Shropshire. They are part of the Morris dance tradition.

== History ==
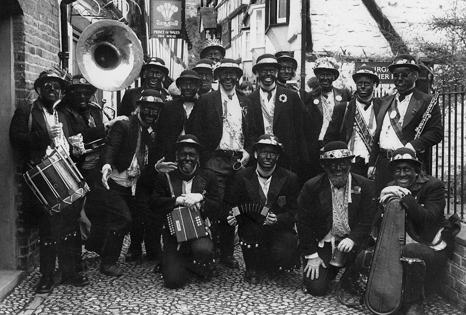
Silurian Border Morris Men, Church Lane, Ledbury, Boxing Day 1996

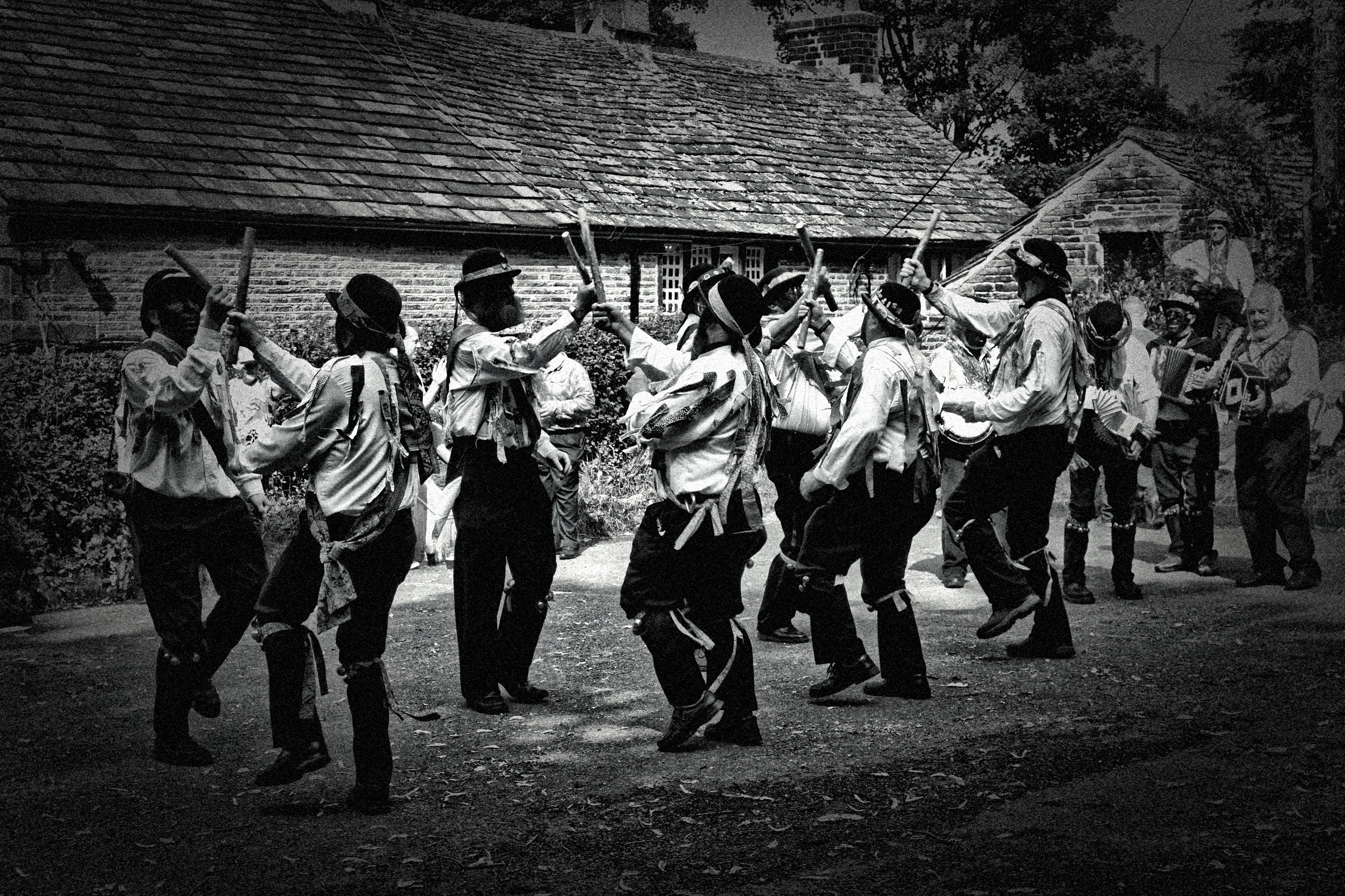
Silurian Border Morris Men dancing Black Ladies Aston, at Saddleworth Rushcart, August 2013

Border morris dances are village dances performed for enjoyment and fundraising, often during winter. They usually include three to twelve dancers.

Some of the earliest accounts of a border morris tradition are provided by E. C. Cawte. There is reference to questions about "any disguised persons, as morice dancers, maskers, or mum'ers" to St. Mary's Parish Church in Shrewsbury in 1584 and an amazing account of morris dancers at Hereford races in 1609, describing "two musicians, four whifflers, and twelve dancers, including hobby horse and maid marian", all from villages within 14 miles (23 km) of Hereford. The account claimed, "Hereford-shire for a morris-daunce puts downe, not onely all Kent, but verie neare (if one had line enough to measure it) three quarters of Christendome".

Cawte quotes further accounts describing complaints to the local magistrates about disruptive morris dancers in Longdon, Worcestershire, disrupting the Sabbath day from 1614 to 1617 and another account of dancers in Much Wenlock in 1652, causing a disturbance in an ale house at Nordley. Later records from Shrewsbury mention payment to the "Bedlam Morris" in 1688 and 1689.

The dance depends on the numbers available, as at Brimfield. The dances collected from a particular place sometimes differ quite markedly between informants, as at White Ladies Aston, reflecting the flexibility from year to year. Sometimes a gang would only have one dance, sometimes two, or as at Malvern and Pershore an indeterminate set of figures.

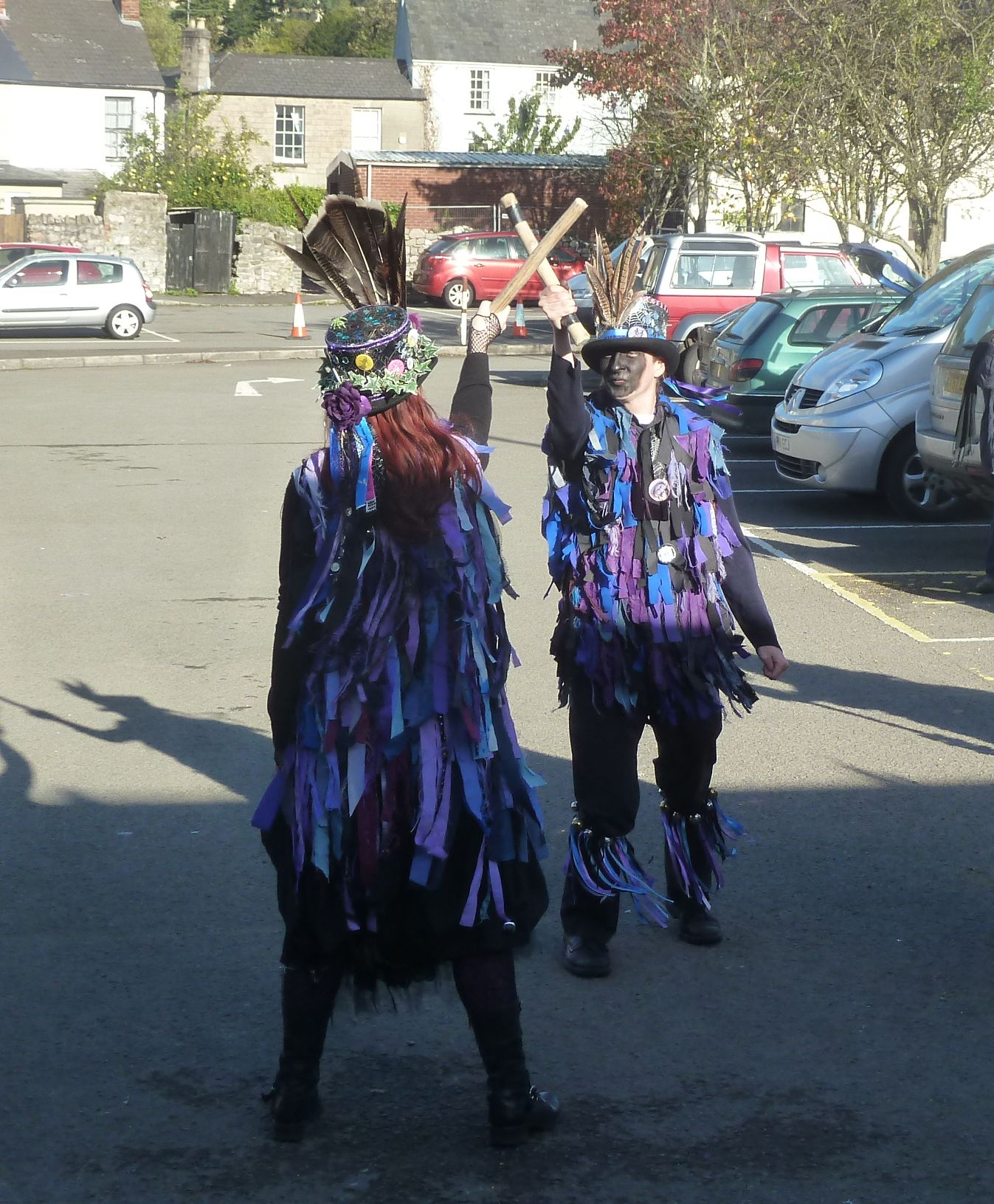
Widders with short sticks

The common features are the rather short sticks and sometimes a stick and handkerchief version of the same dance, also usually a high single step akin to the local country dance step. Such detail as starting foot rules and phrase endings are notable for their apparent absence.

Some of these village sides blackened their faces. There is no record of any sides dancing together. A few – both Upton-on-Severn dances for example – matched the complexity of Cotswolds Morris, but many – e.g. Bromsberrow Heath – had a stark simplicity of one figure and one chorus repeated forever.

== Revival ==
Dancing at Monmouth, as part of the Olympic torch relay, 2012

In the 1960s, E.C. Cawte, the folklorist, proposed that these dances from the English side of the Welsh borders – Herefordshire, Shropshire and Worcestershire – constituted a Welsh border tradition.

Beltane Border Morris performing at Sidmouth Folk Festival 2022

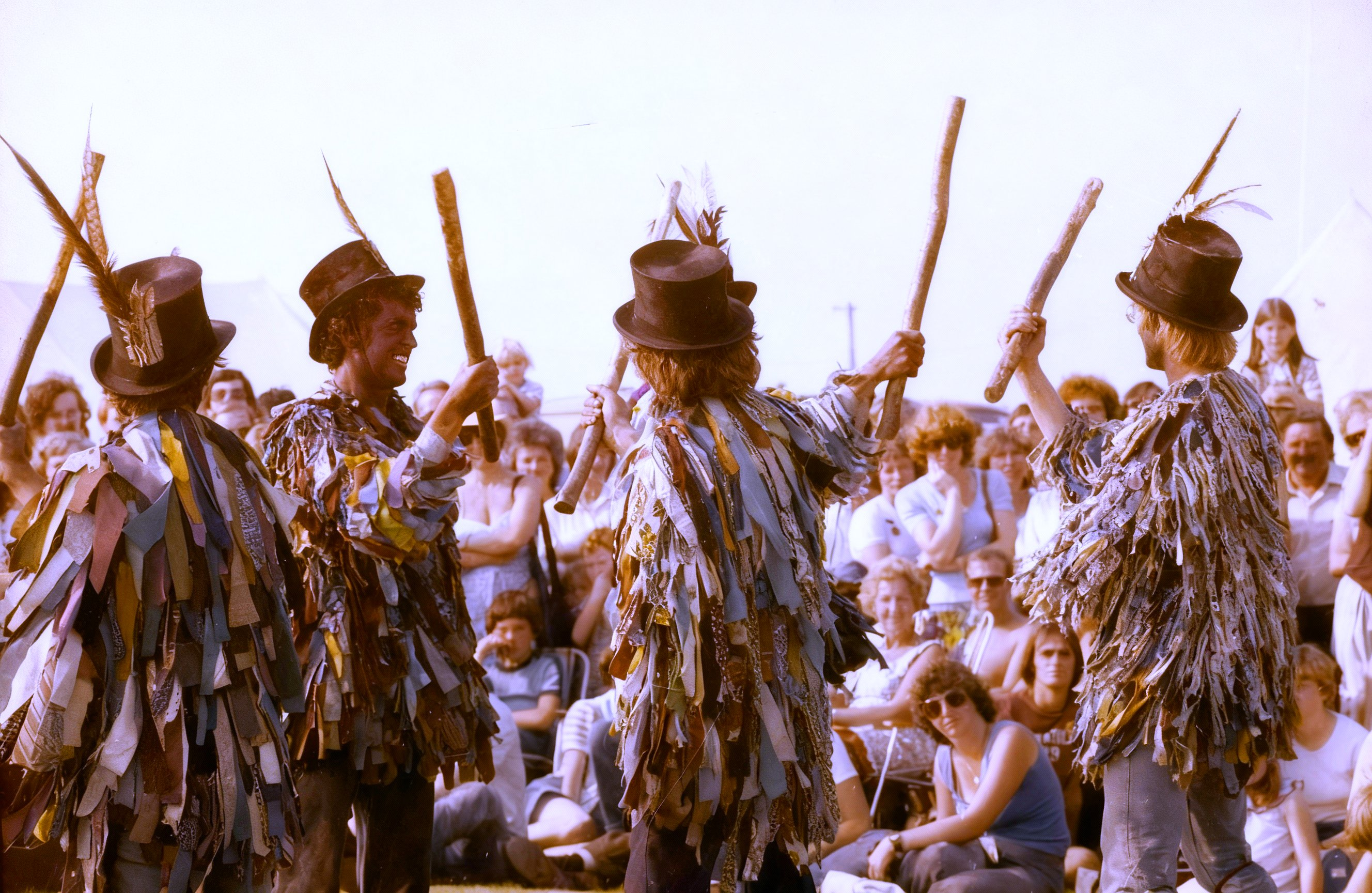
The Shropshire Bedlams at Towersey Festival, 1980

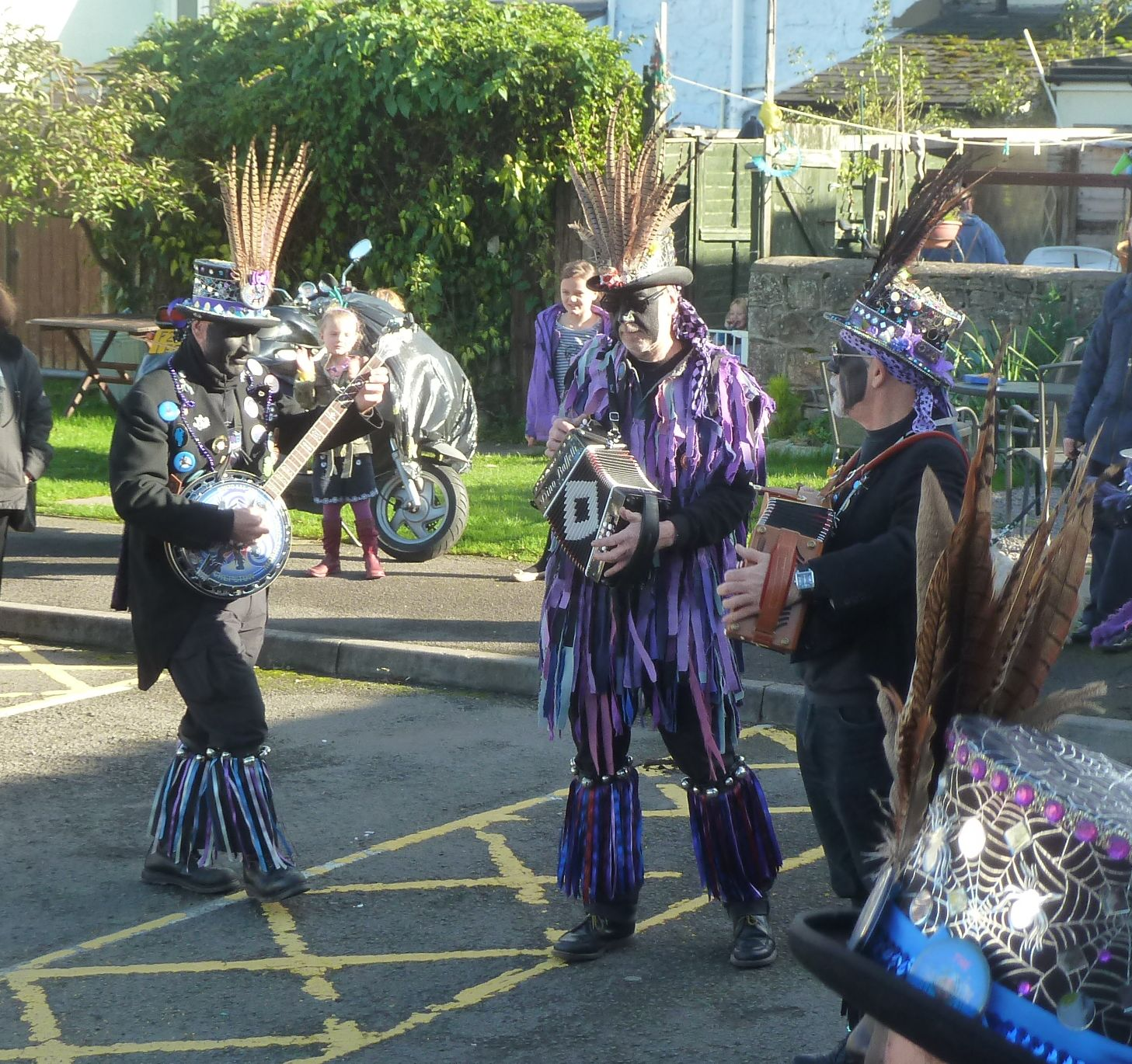
Music for The Widders

Wolf's Head & Vixen Drummers

Since the 1960s and with further collecting in the 1970s by people such as Dave Jones (late of Silurian Morris, founded 1969, and later the Not For Joes) and Keith Francis (of Silurian Morris) a distinctive border morris style has grown. The tradition is characterised by black faces, tattered shirts or coats, much stick-clashing and a big band traditionally comprising melodeons, fiddles, concertinas, triangles and tambourines, although they now often also feature a tuba or sousaphone, and flute or oboe.

Under the guidance of Dave Jones and Keith Francis, Silurian Border Morris sought to interpret the collected dance material, preserving as much of the traditional styles and features as can be deduced. By contrast, in 1975, John Kirkpatrick created a new border tradition with the Shropshire Bedlams, which seeks to capture the spirit of the border sides, but not recreate any specific tradition or dance. Their dances feature much "whooping" and this has become characteristic amongst many other border sides. The Ironmen ( est 1976 ) were another side heavily involved in the 70s revival, their look and style has a more industrial feel and they are one of only two border sides know to dance in clogs. Gordon Ashman and other founder members carried out research around the county of Shropshire, along with several trips to London to visit Cecil Sharp collection. Their style is based on the quarry men, miners and Iron workers that lived and worked in the villages and towns of Shropshire such as Ironbridge, Broseley, Much Wenlock.

Perhaps in keeping with the original tradition, the Original Welsh Border Morris (founded 1973) meet only once a year, at Christmas, and dance the traditional dances of Herefordshire and Worcestershire. With many of the newer sides, the dances have often become complex, involving many invented and evolved steps, figures and choruses.

Many dances were collected by Cecil Sharp and later collectors, and several were included in Bacon's book, but border morris was largely neglected by revival morris sides until late in the 20th century. The Silurian Morris Men of Ledbury, Herefordshire, included border dances in performances from the early 1970s and changed exclusively to border morris in 1979, and the Shropshire Bedlams were founded in 1975; both became pioneers of a resurgence of border morris among revival sides in the following decades.

The Leominster Morris were reformed in 1988, split from The Breinton Morris (who disbanded after a further ten years.) Through contact with E.C. Cawte, with reference to notes made in Leominster, his talking with former dancer, Tom Postons, and his recollections of the dancing of the time as having "lots of bowing, hat-raising, and clashing of sticks on the ground" led to the "revival" of Postons' stick dance. Cecil Sharp visited the town on 27 December 1909 with local folklorist Ella Mary Leather, and collected tunes from the prolific local gypsy fiddler John Locke. The Leominster men use several of Locke's tunes in their repertoire today.

Border morris dancing was different on the Welsh side of the border, and a team on the Welsh side was formed in 1992. Initially the side was named Morys ar y Clwt but it was changed to Carreg-las in 1997. They use traditional Welsh and English folk and morris dance tunes. Carreg-las translates from the Welsh as 'bluestone', a rock found in the Preseli Mountains, in Pembrokeshire, of which it is said Stonehenge was constructed.

== Border Morris Sides ==
Anderida Border Morris: Mixed group based in the South East region.

Anoymous Morris. A large, high-energy, Border Morris team based in Poole.

Beacon Morris, West Midlands.

Beltane Border Morris: Mixed side performing in the West and South West, based in Devon.

Black Pig Border Morris: Mixed team located in the East Midlands.

Blackpowder Morris: Mixed side from the South East.

Black Swan Border Morris, Carshalton, Surrey.

Bocastle Border Morris

Boggart's Breakfast, Sheffield

Bollin Morris: Mixed side performing in Wales and the North West.

Box Hill Bedlam, Dorking, Surrey.

Brixton Tatterjacks: Mixed side active in the South East.

Erstwhile Border Morris: Mixed team based in the West Midlands.

Fishbone Ash: Mixed side located in the South East.

Grimspound Border Morris. Formed around a pub table in Combeinteignhead in 1994

Happenstance Border Morris: Mixed group in the West/South West performing border and mummers traditions.

Hells Bells Border Morris, Essex.

Kent Korkers & Pork Scratchings, Dartford, Kent.

Motley Morris: Men's side based in the South East.

Mucky Mountains Morris: Mixed side operating in Wales and the North West.

Mythago Border Morris, Sussex.

Otter Border Morris: Energetic mixed side based in East Devon.

The Shropshire Bedlams: The historic side credited with kick-starting the modern Border Morris revival in the 1970s

Steampunk Border Morris. A mixed Morris side based in Rochester, Kent. The first specifically Steampunk themed side.

Wolf's Head & Vixen Gothic Morris. A mixed Gothic Morris side based in the Medway and Maidstone areas of Kent. Formed in 1993

Wreckers Border Morris. A mixed Border side based in St Dominick, Cornwall. A group which preforms traditional dances and many original dances inspired by Cornwall's rich heritage

== See also ==
- Blackface and Morris dancing
