= Lectionary 142 =

Coordinates: 45.433336°N 12.339410°E

Lectionary ℓ 142
- New Testament manuscript
- Text: Evangelistarion
- Date: 14th century
- Script: Greek
- Now at: Biblioteca Marciana
- Size: 16.5 by 12.5 cm

Lectionary 142, designated by siglum ℓ 142 (in the Gregory-Aland numbering) is a Greek manuscript of the New Testament, on parchment leaves. Paleographically it has been assigned to the 14th century.

== Description ==
The codex contains Lessons lectionary for the Sunday and feasts with numerous lacunae. The text is written in Greek minuscule letters, on 45 parchment leaves (16.5 by 12.5 cm), in one column per page, 15 lines per page.

== History ==
The manuscript was added to the list of New Testament manuscripts by Scholz. It was examined by Scholz, Mingarelli, and Gregory.

The manuscript is not cited in the critical editions of the Greek New Testament (UBS3).

Currently the codex is located in the Biblioteca Marciana (Gr. I,23 (1418)), in Venedig.

== See also ==
- List of New Testament lectionaries
- Biblical manuscript
- Textual criticism
- Lectionary 141

== Bibliography ==
- J. M. A. Scholz, Biblisch-kritische Reise in Frankreich, der Schweiz, Italien, Palästine und im Archipel in den Jahren 1818, 1819, 1820, 1821: Nebst einer Geschichte des Textes des Neuen Testaments.
- G. L. Mingarelli, Graeci codices manuscripti apud Nanios patricios Venetos asservati, Bologna 1784, p. 12.
