= Minuscule 205 =

- New Testament manuscript
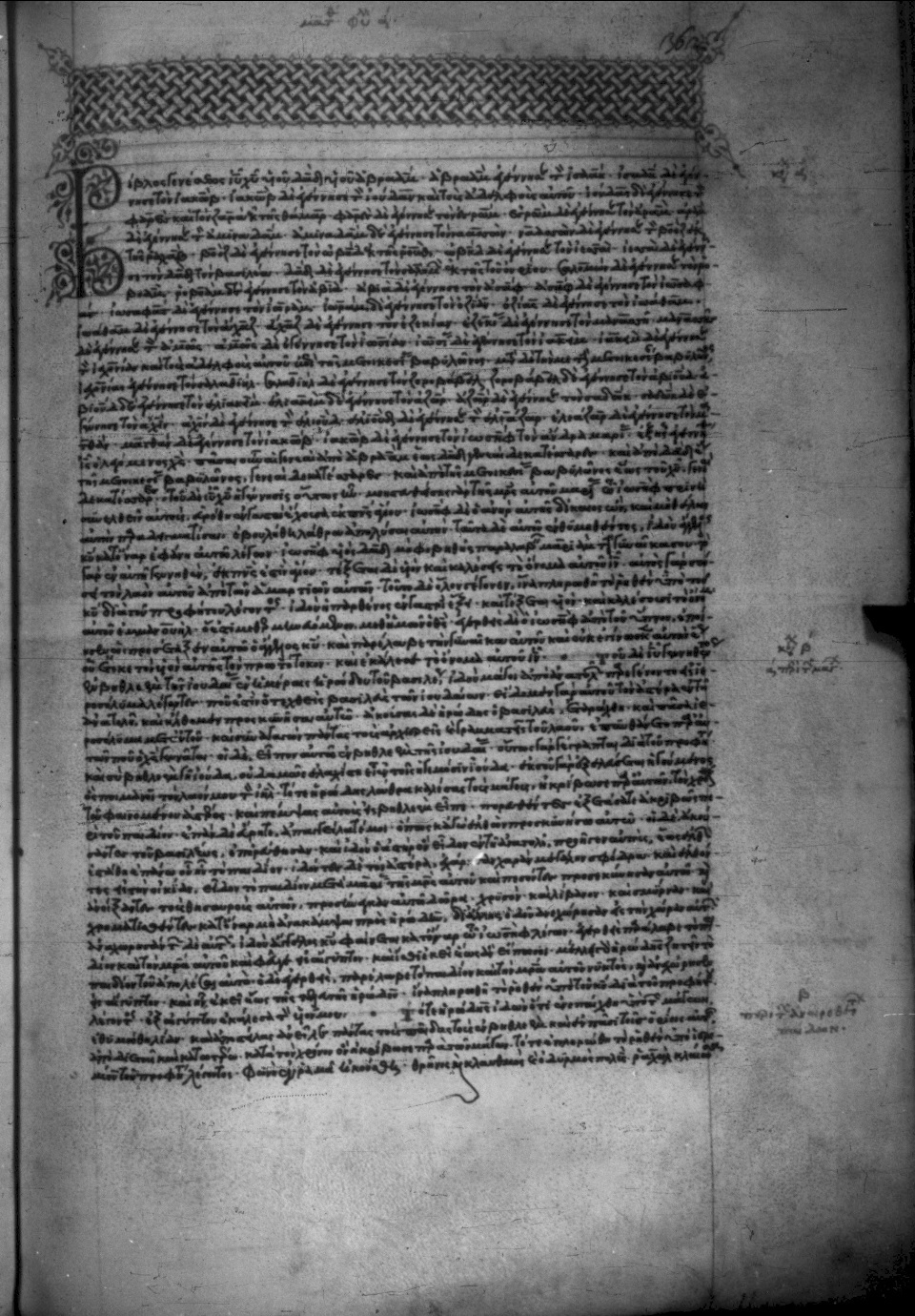
- Text: New Testament, Old Testament
- Date: 15th century
- Script: Greek
- Now at: Biblioteca Marciana
- Size: 39.8 cm by 28 cm
- Type: Caesarean, Byzantine
- Category: III, V
- Note: member of f^{1}

Minuscule 205 (in the Gregory-Aland numbering), δ 500 (Soden), 68 (Rahlfs), is a Greek minuscule manuscript of the Old and the New Testament, on parchment, from the 15th century. It has some marginalia.

== Description ==
The codex contains the text of the New Testament on 441 parchment leaves (size 39.8 cm by 28 cm). The order of the books: Gospels, Acts of the Apostles, Catholic epistles, Pauline epistles, and Apocalypse. It is written in one column per page, in 55-56 lines per page.

It contains Prolegomena to Catholic and Pauline epistles, lists of the κεφαλαια (tables of contents) before each book, numbers of the κεφαλαια (chapters) are given at the margin in Greek and Latin, the τιτλοι (titles of chapters) at the top of the pages, and subscriptions at the end of each book. Text of Mark 16:9-20 is marked by an obelus.

It contains also the Old Testament (except Book of Daniel).

== Text ==
The Greek text of the codex is a representative of the Caesarean text-type in the Gospels and the Byzantine text-type in rest of books of the codex. Aland placed it in Category III in Gospels and Revelation, and in Category V in rest of books.

It is a member of the Family 1 in the Gospels. It creates a pair with 209.

== History ==
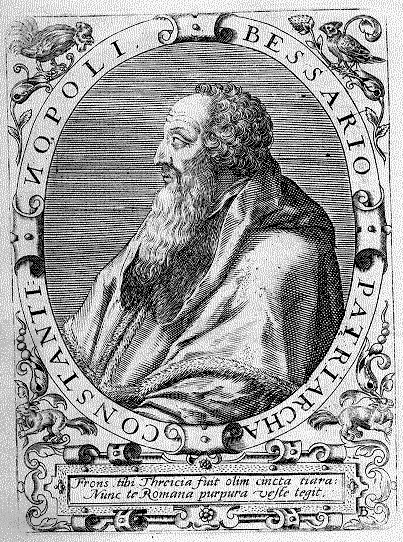
Cardinal Bessarion

Paleographically it has been assigned to the 15th century. The manuscript was written by John Rhosus for Cardinal Bessarion († 1472), together with the codices 354 and 357. Rhosus was librarian of Cardinal. In 1468 it was sent to the library of Cardinal.

It was added to the list of the New Testament manuscripts by Griesbach.

It was examined by Birch and Burgon. G. F. Rinck considers it in the Gospels a mere copy of the codex 209. Burgon argued that both were transcribed from the same uncial archetype as codex 209. C. R. Gregory saw it in 1886.

It is currently housed at the Biblioteca Marciana (Gr. Z 5), at Venice, together with the 205^{abs}, which was thought to be a copy of 205. However, more recently Welsby has demonstrated that 205 is in fact the copy and 205abs the original. 205abs is now known as minuscule 2886 in the Gregory-Aland classification.

== See also ==
- List of New Testament minuscules
- Septuagint manuscripts
- Biblical manuscript
- Textual criticism
