= Minuscule 448 =

- New Testament manuscript
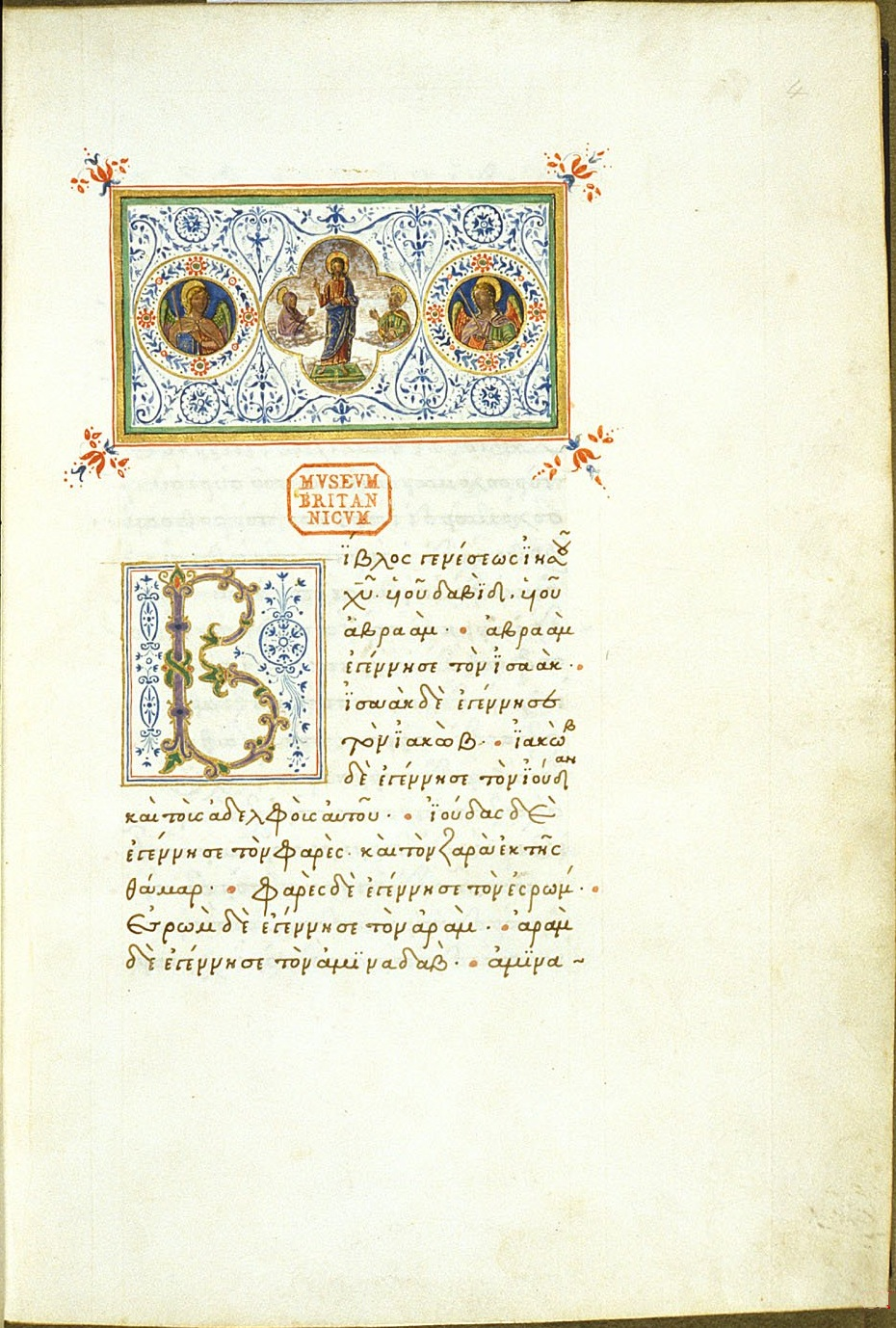
- Folio 4, beginning of the Gospel of Matthew
- Text: Gospels †
- Date: 1478
- Script: Greek
- Now at: British Library
- Size: 31.2 cm by 21.5 cm
- Type: Byzantine text-type
- Category: V
- Note: marginalia

Minuscule 448 (in the Gregory-Aland numbering), ε 509 (in the Soden numbering), is a Greek minuscule manuscript of the New Testament, on parchment. It is dated by a colophon to the year 1478. It has marginalia.

== Description ==
The codex contains a complete text of the four Gospels on 299 parchment leaves (31.2 cm by 21.5 cm). The text is written in one column per page, in 22 lines per page.

The text is divided according to the κεφαλαια (chapters) whose numerals are given at the margin, and the τιτλοι (titles of chapters) at the top of the pages.

It contains lists of the κεφαλαια (tables of contents) before each Gospel, subscriptions at the end of each Gospel, and very beautiful pictures.

== Text ==
The Greek text of the codex is a representative of the Byzantine text-type. Hermann von Soden classified it to the Antiocheian (i.e. Byzantine) commentated text. Aland placed it in Category V. According to the Claremont Profile Method it represents the textual family K^{x} in Luke 1 and Luke 20. It belongs also to the textual cluster 183. In Luke 10 no profile was made.

== History ==
According to the colophon it was written in Rome, April 25, 1478 by John Rhosos of Crete for Francis Gonzaga Cardinal of St. Maria Nuova. There is a note that Rhosos also wrote the Vatican Homer in 1477 for Cardinal Gonazaga. Then it belonged to Giovanni Pietro Arrivabene. Nathaniel Noel purchased it for the Harleian Library between 20 January between 1721 and 1722.

The manuscript was added to the list of New Testament manuscripts by Scholz (1794–1852). It was examined by Scholz (only Mark 5). C. R. Gregory saw it in 1883.

It is currently housed at the British Library (Harley MS 5790).

== See also ==
- List of New Testament minuscules
- Biblical manuscript
- Textual criticism
