= Lectionary 141 =

11th century Greek manuscript of the New Testament

Lectionary ℓ 141
- New Testament manuscript
- Text: Evangelistarion
- Date: 11th century
- Script: Greek
- Now at: Biblioteca Marciana
- Size: 30 by 24.5 cm

Lectionary 141, designated by sigla ℓ 141 (in the Gregory-Aland numbering) is a Greek manuscript of the New Testament, on parchment leaves. Paleographically it has been assigned to the 11th century.

== Description ==
The codex contains Lessons from the Gospels of John, Matthew, Luke lectionary (Evangelistarium), on 270 parchment leaves (30 cm by 24.5 cm). It is written in Greek minuscule letters, in two columns per page, 15 lines per page.

== History ==
The manuscript came from the Saint Catherine's Monastery in Sinai. The manuscript was added to the list of New Testament manuscripts by Scholz. It was examined by Scholz, Mingarelli, and Gregory.

The manuscript is not cited in the critical editions of the Greek New Testament (UBS3).

Currently the codex is located in the Biblioteca Marciana (Gr. I,9), in Venice.

== See also ==
- List of New Testament lectionaries
- Biblical manuscript
- Textual criticism
- Lectionary 142

== Bibliography ==
- J. M. A. Scholz, Biblisch-kritische Reise in Frankreich, der Schweiz, Italien, Palästine und im Archipel in den Jahren 1818, 1819, 1820, 1821: Nebst einer Geschichte des Textes des Neuen Testaments.
- G. L. Mingarelli, Graeci codices manuscripti apud Nanios patricios Venetos asservati, Bologna 1784, p. 2.
