= Alex Helm =

British folklorist (1920–1970)

Alex Helm (1920–1970) was a British folklorist, described as "one of the most important figures in the study of calendar custom and [folk] dance in post-war England". Helm served in India during the Second World War, before working as a teacher for the rest of his career. As a folklorist, he worked on English ritual dance and drama, publishing "A Geographical Index of the Ceremonial Dance in Great Britain" in two parts in 1960 and 1961, and English Ritual Drama: A Geographical Index in 1967.

== Early life and education ==
Helm was born in Burnley, Lancashire, in 1920, becoming interested in folk dancing whilst attending Burnley Grammar School. Helm was taught to dance by Irene Fisher, who was involved with the local branch of the English Folk Dance and Song Society.

He trained to become a teacher at St John's College, York. While at York, Helm continued to practice folk-dance; he also took up printing and bookbinding. After finishing teacher training, Helm joined the army, where during the Second World War he served in the Indian Army Ordnance Corps, reaching the rank of major. While posted in India, Helm met his future wife, Mehr Suntook ("Sunny"). He served in India until it became independent in 1947, whereupon he returned to England.

== Career ==
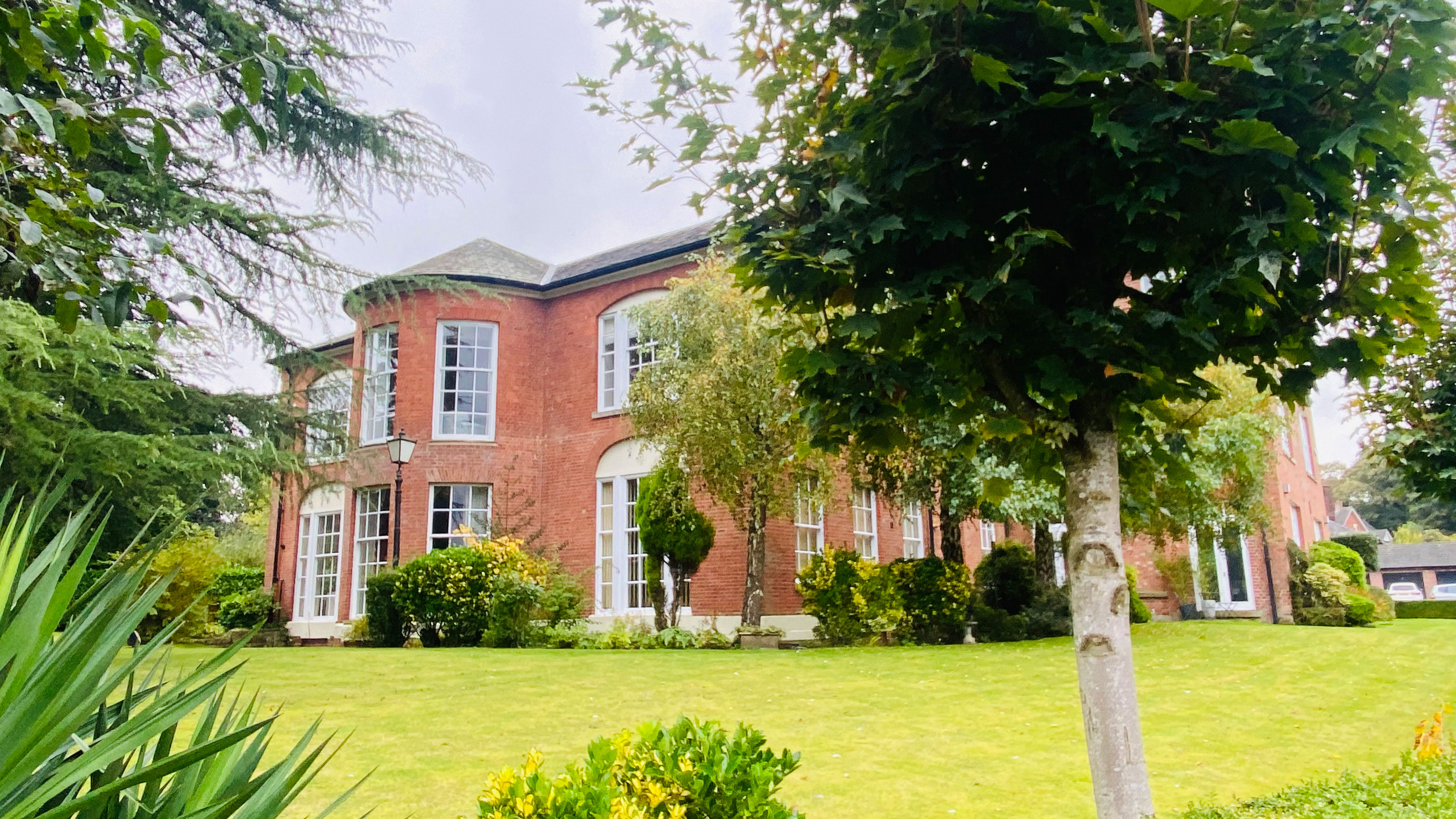
The former Danesford School in Congleton, Cheshire, where Helm worked for most of his career

After the war, Helm taught at Northumberland Heath Secondary School, Erith. While in Erith, Helm married, and his first child was born. In 1949 he moved to Danesford School, an approved school in Congleton, Cheshire. His second child was born in 1953. In 1968 he was made deputy headmaster at Danesford. He was also part of a Home Office committee on approved schools.

== Folklore research ==
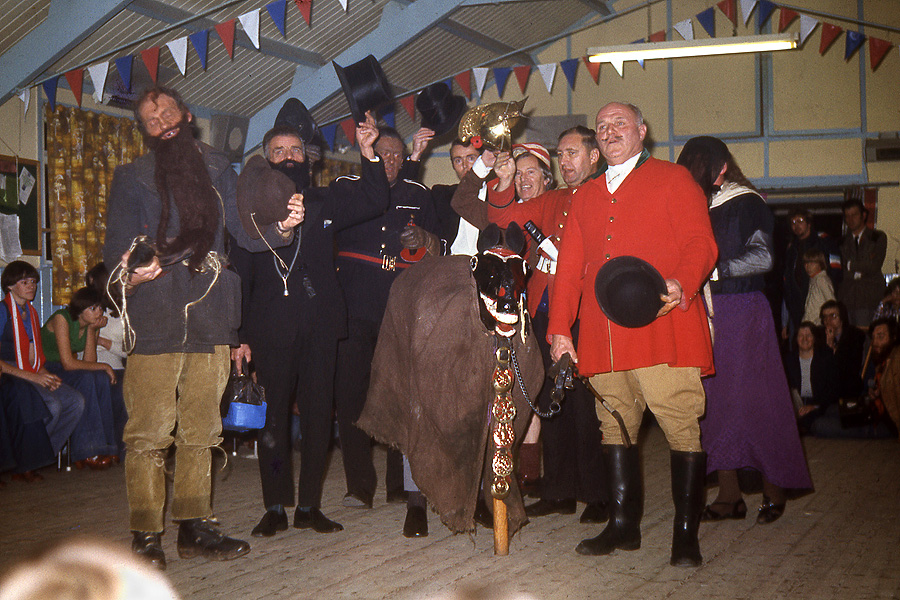
Antrobus soul cakers performing the Cheshire soul-caking play

Helm began to take an interest in the history of dances and dramatic traditions of Lancashire and Cheshire, in part influenced by Margaret Dean-Smith, Librarian of the English Folk Dance and Song Society (EFDSS), with whom Helm had helped to sort and index the Society's papers. Within a year of his move to Cheshire he had published research on ‘The Cheshire Soul-caking Play’, a type of folk play that had been little studied.

During this period Helm, now a member of the Manchester Morris Men troupe, also began to research Lancastrian Morris traditions. From 1956 to 1958, he had a regular column in the EDFSS journal English Dance and Song.

Helm joined the Folklore Society in 1954, and from 1958 was on the society's council. He soon made a study of the papers of T. F. Ordish, held in the collections of the Society. Ordish, a 19th-century folklorist who specialised on mummers' plays, had planned – but never completed – a monograph on British folk drama. From 1966, Helm helped teach a series of summer schools at Keele University on the "Folklife of Britain", run in collaboration with the Folklore Society and EFDSS.

Inspired by this work, Helm's research expanded from folk dance and folk play into creating a geographical index of British seasonal customs, of which folk dance and folk play would form sections. For this project he worked with a group of researchers – E. C. Cawte, Norman Peacock and Roger Marriott. The group co-authored "A Geographical Index of the Ceremonial Dance in Great Britain", which was published as two journal articles in 1960 and 1961 and English Ritual Drama: A Geographical Index in 1967. English Ritual Drama is now seen as a seminal work, being the "first systematic attempt to list every known occurrence of the folk play in Britain and to provide a source for each location".

== Recognition and influence ==
In 1968 Helm was awarded the Coote Lake Medal of the Folklore Society, for "outstanding research and scholarship" in the field of Folklore Studies. Whilst never a field collector, he was hailed for his "great ability to interest and stimulate others, and to guide them with his deep and growing knowledge".

Helm died in 1970: his life and work being "cut short as he reached his peak". His collaborator E. C. Cawte dedicated his 1978 monograph Ritual Animal Disguise to Helm. Helm's books The English Mummer's Play and Staffordshire Folk Drama were published posthumously in 1981 and 1984.

Helm had a considerable influence on later customs researchers in England, particularly through the geographic approach he advocated. His argument that folk dance and folk play should be studied as rituals or customs – as opposed to the literary approach adopted by earlier scholars like E. K. Chambers – became the adopted model (although one criticised by later researchers).

== Collections ==
Helm's research papers – including correspondence, manuscript notebooks and working papers for his research on seasonal customs – are held at University College London.

== Selected publications ==
- Helm, Alex (1950). "The Cheshire Soul-Caking Play". Journal of the English Folk Dance and Song Society. 6 (2): 45–50. ISSN 0071-0563
- Helm, Alex (1954). "The Rushcart and the North-Western Morris". Journal of the English Folk Dance and Song Society. 7 (3): 172–179. ISSN 0071-0563
- Helm, Alex (1955-09-01). "Report on the Ordish Papers". Folklore. 66 (3): 360–362. doi:10.1080/0015587X.1955.9717489 ISSN 0015-587X
- Cawte, E. C.; Helm, Alex; Marriott, R. J.; Peacock, N. (1960). "A Geographical Index of the Ceremonial Dance in Great Britain: Part One". Journal of the English Folk Dance and Song Society. 9 (1): ii–41. ISSN 0071-0563
- Cawte, E. C.; Helm, Alex; Peacock, N. (1961). "A Geographical Index of the Ceremonial Dance in Great Britain: Addenda and Corrigenda". Journal of the English Folk Dance and Song Society. 9 (2): 93–95. ISSN 0071-0563
- Helm, Alex (1965-06-01). "In Comes I, St George". Folklore. 76 (2): 118–136. doi:10.1080/0015587X.1965.9716997 ISSN 0015-587X
- Cawte, E. C; Helm, Alex; Peacock, N (1967). English ritual drama: a geographical index,. London: Folk-lore Society. ISBN 978-0-903515-01-6 OCLC 124592
- Helm, Alex (1981). The English mummers' play: With a foreword by N. Peacock and E.C. Cawte. Woodbridge, Suffolk: Brewer. ISBN 978-0-85991-067-5 OCLC 633313812
