= Ella Mary Leather =

English collector of folklore and songs

- Ella Mary Leather in 1918
- Born: 26 March 1874; Bidney, Dilwyn, United Kingdom of Great Britain and Ireland
- Died: 7 June 1928 (aged 54)
- Burial place: Weobley Cemetery, Weobley, Herefordshire, England
- Occupation: Folklorist

Ella Mary Leather (née Smith, 26 March 1874 – 7 June 1928) was a British collector of the local folklore and songs of Herefordshire. Her seminal work, Folklore of Herefordshire, published in 1912, has been recognized as an authoritative "model of scientific scholarship." Amongst her other works are Twelve Traditional Carols from Herefordshire, a collaboration with Ralph Vaughan Williams, and various notes to the journal of The Folklore Society.

== Early life ==
Ella Mary Smith was born 26 March 1874 in the hamlet of Bidney, in Dilwyn parish, Herefordshire, England to Mary Ann (née Griffiths) and James Smith, a farmer. After attending Clyde House School, she completed her schooling at Hereford High School for Girls. Smith married a solicitor, Francis Leather, in 1893 and the two moved to the town of Weobley, where their three sons, John Francis, Geoffrey and Godfrey were born.

== Career ==
When Leather first became interested in collecting folklore is unknown, but by 1904 her private journals indicate that she had already compiled networks of collaborators with whom she was working to gather folk songs of the area. A local author, Reverend Compton Reade asked her to contribute a chapter, "The Folk-Lore of the Shire", to his book Memorials of Old Herefordshire published in that year. In 1905, she joined both the Folk-Lore and the Folk-Song Societies. As her skill with music was rudimentary, she had difficulty providing transcriptions of tunes until 1906, when she was put in contact with composer Ralph Vaughan Williams. Williams secured for Leather a phonograph which had the ability to record and reproduce sound. By 1907, her reputation as an authority on folk lore was firmly established, when she published a selection of folk tales in the inaugural issue of Herefordshire Magazine.

Leather worked with Cecil Sharp in making wax cylinder recordings. One of his recordings occurred in December 1909, when Leather took him to see Morris dancers on Boxing day in Brimfield. She copied down the dance steps to accompany the recording and on the same trip, introduced Sharp to local fiddlers John Lock and William Preece, who were also recorded by the duo. Sharp found using the new technology to record folk tunes impracticable, but Leather is thought to have recorded close to thirty songs on multiple cylinders between 1907 and 1913 and possibly a dozen more.

Leather's seminal work, Folklore of Herefordshire published in 1912, has been recognized as authoritative and was reprinted numerous times through 1990. It contained lyrics and music notations for 23 ballads, carols, and songs and was fully referenced with extensive notes on sources and people who were consulted on the materials. That year, she introduced Williams to several local traveller encampments and he collected the song, "The Unquiet Grave" from tenor Alfred Price Jones. The two would collaborate in 1920 on Twelve Traditional Carols from Herefordshire.

In 1913, Leather put aside her collecting and began working as the Commandant of the Red Cross volunteers stationed at Sarnesfield Court Hospital. For the duration of the war, she invested her time to war activities. Her son, John Francis, died in France in 1918. When the war ended, much of her time was devoted to other endeavors. She was a sought-after speaker for antiquarian societies and worked with the Women's Institute. In 1925 she published Collecting Folk-Melodies from Gypsies in Herefordshire, which was based on material she had collected between 1908 and 1912. That same year she was a co-founder of the Herefordshire chapter of the English Folk Dance Society.

In 1926, Leather published "The Timber Houses of Weobley" in the Woolhope Naturalists Club's journal Transactions. That year, a dance she had collected, "Haste to the Wedding" was performed at the Royal Albert Hall in the first National Festival of Folk Dance. Intent on saving Weobley's old grammar school, she purchased the 17th-century building, using it as a private study. She also published a guide to the parish church and began work on the History of Weobley, but she did not complete it prior to her death. In 1928, she served as president of the Herefordshire Women's Institute.

== Death and legacy ==
Leather died suddenly from a heart attack on 7 June 1928, aged 54, and was buried at the Weobley Cemetery. She is remembered for her collaborations with Sharp and Williams, but also for her original work in collecting folk songs and dances from Herefordshire. With the exception of Percy Grainger, "Leather made more phonograph recordings than any of the other collectors associated with the Folk-Song Society," though songs that she discovered often were credited to her collaborators. Her papers are housed in the Vaughan Williams Memorial Library of London.
