= T. Fairman Ordish =

British Folklorist (1855–1924)

Thomas Fairman Ordish (1855-1924), sometimes also referred to as T. Fairman Ordish was a British folklorist, noted for his interest in traditional drama and folk play, early theatre (especially the plays of William Shakespeare) and the history of London. He is credited as having undertaken "the first major investigation of British traditional drama".

== Early life and education ==
Ordish was born in 1855 in Brompton, Middlesex. Privately educated, he was first employed as a publisher's clerk before moving to the Patent Office in London. He remained there for the rest of his working life, taking early retirement in 1918.

== Interests in early theatre ==
Ordish developed an interest in early theatre and Shakespeare. He published two books on the topic: Early London Theatres (In the Fields) (1894), and Shakespeare’s London: A Study of London in the Reign of Queen Elizabeth (1897). The former developed from a number of articles Ordish wrote for The Antiquary and has been described as "the first systematic critical study of the evidence relating to the old playhouses" and establishing the groundwork for a number of later studies.

In 1902 Ordish formed the London Shakespeare League, which has been credited with reviving the performance of Shakespeare's plays.

Ordish was also a founder member of the London Topographical Society, edited the Society's Record from 1901 to 1906. He also contributed articles to the Society's Record - as he did to numerous other journals. It's been calculated that Ordish published over 70 articles and monographs.

== Interests in folklore ==
Oridis's interest in folk play probably developed from his interest in early theatre. Ordish witnessed folk plays in the 1880s and 1890 and began the "first real attempt to make a systematic collection of material on mumming plays and sword dances".

As Ordish's interests in these fields grew, he joined the Folklore Society in 1886. Ordish was also moving in the same social circles as members of the Folklore Society - particularly the Gomme family - through his membership of the London Topographical Society and other organisations. Oridsh would play an active part in the administration of the Society, including being the chairman of the organising committee of the 1891 International Folklore Congress.

Ordish's articles in the Folklore Society journal, put forward his theories on traditional dramas and folk plays. He argued that mumming and sword dances - along with local pageants and processions - were a direct survival of Anglo-Saxon and Danish customs (which had even earlier pagan origins). For Ordish, it was these folk plays which lay behind the flourishing of drama which took place in Elizabethan England. This reading was counter to the then prevailing view of historians of the theatre who framed their arguments around surviving literary texts of medieval miracle and mystery plays. Whilst Ordish's 'survivals' argument is no longer accepted by historians, his interest and ideas on folk play - and the collection he put together - were a major inspiration for later researchers.

== Later life ==
After retirement from the Patent Office, Ordish and his family moved from London to live in Herne Bay, Kent. He died on 5 December 1924 in a nursing home in Leytonstone, Essex.

== Collection ==
Ordish assembled a sizeable collection of materials relating to folk plays, primarily through appeals for assistance to fellow folklorists, but also through his own collecting. He aimed to use this collection to write and then publish a sizeable work on the topic of mummers' plays, but this volume - although often talked about as being in preparation - did not appear before Ordish's death.

On his death, his collection was passed on to the Folklore Society. It was rediscovered and catalogued in the 1950s by Margaret Dean-Smith and Alex Helm. Helms's work on this collection was directly responsible for his further work on the topic and the rise in profile during the 1960s of research into folk play.

Ordish's original collection is now deposited with the other archives of the Folklore Society in the Special Collections of University College London.

A typescript of Oridish's collection was made by Alex Helm in the 1950s. Copies of this typescript are held in archives of the Folklore Society and at the Vaughan Williams Memorial Library (VWML) of the English Folk Dance and Song Society. The copy of the typescript in the VWML has now been digitised and is available online.

== Selected publications ==
Ordish, T. Fairman (1889). "Morris Dance at Revesby". The Folk-Lore Journal. 7 (5): 331–356. ISSN 1744-2524.

Ordish, T. Fairman (1891-09-01). "Folk-Drama". Folklore. 2 (3): 314–335. doi:10.1080/0015587X.1891.9720068. ISSN 0015-587X.

Ordish, T. Fairman (1893-06-01). "English Folk-Drama". Folklore. 4 (2): 149–175. doi:10.1080/0015587X.1893.9720150. ISSN 0015-587X.

Ordish, T. Fairman (1894). Early London theatres. London: E. Stock. OCLC 932837552.

Ordish, T. Fairman (1897). Shakespeare's London; a study of London in the reign of Queen Elizabeth. London: J.M. Dent & Co. OCLC 1358664.
