= Lectionary 265 =

Lectionary ℓ 265
- New Testament manuscript
- Text: Evangelistarium
- Date: 10th century
- Script: Greek
- Now at: Biblioteca Marciana
- Size: 34 cm by 26 cm
- Hand: barbarously written

Lectionary 265, designated by siglum ℓ 265 (in the Gregory-Aland numbering) is a Greek manuscript of the New Testament, on parchment. Palaeographically it has been assigned to the 10th century. Scrivener labelled it as 171^{e}, Gregory by 158^{e}. The manuscript has no complex contents.

== Description ==
The codex contains lessons from the Gospel of John, Matthew, and Luke (Evangelistarium), with lacunae at the beginning.

The text is written in Greek large uncial letters, on 78 parchment leaves (34 cm by 26 cm), in two columns per page, 20 lines per page. It is ornamented.

== History ==
Scrivener and Gregory dated the manuscript to the 10th century. It has been assigned by the Institute for New Testament Textual Research (INTF) to the 10th century.

It has also note "Gallicio 1624".

The manuscript was added to the list of New Testament manuscripts by Scrivener (number 171^{e}) and Gregory (number 265^{e}). Gregory saw the manuscript in 1886. It was described by Carlo Castellani.

The manuscript is not cited in the critical editions of the Greek New Testament (UBS3).

The codex is housed at the Biblioteca Marciana (Gr. I.45 (927)) in Venedig.

== See also ==
- List of New Testament lectionaries
- Biblical manuscript
- Textual criticism
- Lectionary 264

== Bibliography ==
- Gregory, Caspar René (1900). Textkritik des Neuen Testaments, Vol. 1. Leipzig. p. 409.
- Carlo Castellani, Catalogo dei codici Greci, Venedig 1895, pp. 56–57 (number 28)
