= Lectionary 110 =

Lectionary ℓ 110
- New Testament manuscript
- Text: Evangelistarion
- Date: 13th-century
- Script: Greek
- Now at: Biblioteca Marciana
- Size: 35 cm by 25.5 cm

Lectionary 110, designated by siglum ℓ 110 (in the Gregory-Aland numbering) is a Greek manuscript of the New Testament, on parchment leaves. Palaeographically it has been assigned to the 13th-century.

== Description ==
The codex contains lessons from the Gospels of John, Matthew, Luke lectionary (Evangelistarium) with lacunae at the end. It is written in Greek minuscule letters, on 279 parchment leaves (35 cm by 25.5 cm), in 2 columns per page, 22 lines per page. Scrivener described it as "a glorious codex". The last few leaves were supplied in the 16th-century on paper.

== History ==
The manuscript was added to the list of New Testament manuscripts by Scholz. It was examined by Burgon.

The manuscript is not cited in the critical editions of the Greek New Testament (UBS3).

Currently the codex is located in the Biblioteca Marciana (Gr. Z. 551 (826)) in Venice.

== See also ==
- List of New Testament lectionaries
- Biblical manuscript
- Textual criticism
