= Lectionary 108 =

Historical manuscript

Lectionary ℓ 108
- New Testament manuscript
- Text: Evangelistarion
- Date: 11th-century
- Script: Greek
- Now at: Biblioteca Marciana
- Size: 31 cm by 23.5 cm

Lectionary 108, designated by siglum ℓ 108 (in the Gregory-Aland numbering) is a Greek manuscript of the New Testament, on parchment leaves. Palaeographically it has been assigned to the 11th-century.

== Description ==
The codex contains weekday lessons from the Gospels of John, Matthew, Luke lectionary (Evangelistarium) with lacunae at the end. It is written in Greek minuscule letters, on 292 parchment leaves (31 cm by 23.5 cm), in 2 columns per page, 23 lines per page. It contains musical notes.

== History ==
The manuscript was added to the list of New Testament manuscripts by Scholz. It was examined by Dean Burgon.

The manuscript is not cited in the critical editions of the Greek New Testament (UBS3).

Currently the codex is located in the Biblioteca Marciana (Gr. Z. 549 (655)) in Venice.

== See also ==
- List of New Testament lectionaries
- Biblical manuscript
- Textual criticism

== Bibliography ==
- Gregory, Caspar René (1900). Textkritik des Neuen Testaments. Vol. 1. Leipzig: J.C. Hinrichs. p. 396.
