= Minuscule 357 =

- New Testament manuscript
- Text: Luke, John
- Date: 11th century
- Script: Greek
- Now at: Biblioteca Marciana
- Size: 32 cm by 21.5 cm
- Type: Byzantine text-type
- Category: V
- Note: marginalia

Minuscule 357 (in the Gregory-Aland numbering), A^{135} (Soden), is a Greek minuscule manuscript of the New Testament, on parchment. Palaeographically it has been assigned to the 11th century. It has marginalia.

== Description ==
The codex contains the text of the Gospel of Luke and Gospel of John on 281 parchment leaves (32 cm by 21.5 cm) with catena. The text is written in one column per page, in 35 lines per page.

The text is divided according to the κεφαλαια (chapters), whose numbers are given at the margin, and their τιτλοι (titles of chapters) at the top of the pages.

It contains the tables of the κεφαλαια (tables of contents) before each Gospel (later hand), lectionary markings at the margin for liturgical use.

== Text ==
The Greek text of the codex is a representative of the Byzantine text-type. Aland placed it in Category V.

It was not examined by using the Claremont Profile Method.

== History ==
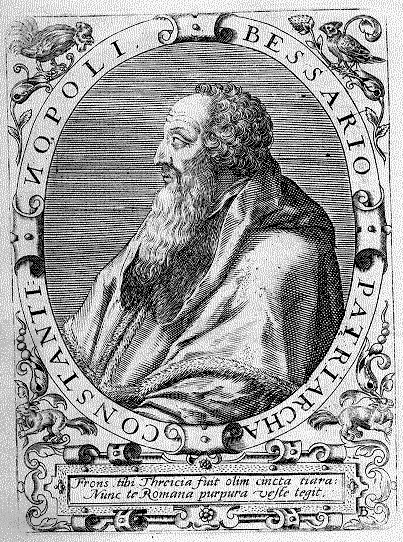
Cardinal Bessarion

The manuscript once belonged to Cardinal Bessarion (as codices 205, 354). In 1722 it was in the hands of Hieronymus Venerius. The manuscript was added to the list of New Testament manuscripts by Scholz (1794-1852). It was examined by Burgon. C. R. Gregory saw it in 1886.

The manuscript is currently housed at the Biblioteca Marciana (Gr. Z. 28) in Venice.

== See also ==
- List of New Testament minuscules
- Biblical manuscript
- Textual criticism
