= Lectionary 264 =

Lectionary ℓ 264
- New Testament manuscript
- Text: Evangelistarium
- Date: 1318
- Script: Greek
- Now at: Biblioteca Marciana
- Size: 21.5 cm by 14.5 cm
- Hand: barbarously written

Lectionary 264, designated by siglum ℓ 264 (in the Gregory-Aland numbering) is a Greek manuscript of the New Testament, on paper. It is dated by a colophon to the year 1381. Scrivener labelled it as 170^{e}, Gregory by 158^{e}. The manuscript has complex contents.

== Description ==
The codex contains lessons from the Gospel of John, Matthew, and Luke (Evangelistarium).

The text is written in Greek large minuscule letters, on 209 paper leaves (21.5 cm by 14.5 cm), in one column per page, 21 lines per page. According to Scrivener it is rather barbarously written.

The manuscript contains weekday Gospel lessons from Easter to Pentecost and Saturday/Sunday Gospel lessons for the other weeks.

== History ==
According to the colophon it was written 1381 by Presbyter John.

The colophon stated:

ει και ασφαλματα ευρηται εν τη βιβλω ταυτην, του αγιου και πανσεπτος ευαγγελιου ευχεστε δηα τον κν και μη καρασθε ωτι ουδης διναται, γραφη ανευ βορβωρου και σσωλωι κεισμου ωτι και ο γραφων παραγραφει εγραφη δε το παρον και αγιον ευαγγελιων διαχιρος ιωαννου ιερεις΄εμνηνη διδαιμβριω εις την ια επι ετους ςωπ.

It has also note "Gallicio 1624".

The manuscript was added to the list of New Testament manuscripts by Scrivener (number 170^{e}) and Gregory (number 264^{e}). Gregory saw the manuscript in 1886. It was described by Carlo Castellani.

The manuscript is not cited in the critical editions of the Greek New Testament (UBS3).

Currently the codex is housed at the Biblioteca Marciana (Gr. I.4 (1396)) in Venedig.

== See also ==
- List of New Testament lectionaries
- Biblical manuscript
- Textual criticism
- Lectionary 265

== Bibliography ==
- Gregory, Caspar René (1900). Textkritik des Neuen Testaments, Vol. 1. Leipzig. p. 409.
- Carlo Castellani, Catalogus codicum graecorum qui in bibliothecam D. Marci Venetiarum inde ab anno MDCCXL ad haec usque tempora inlati sunt, Venedig 1895, p. 50 (number 25)
