= Lectionary 109 =

Lectionary ℓ 109
- New Testament manuscript
- Text: Evangelistarion
- Date: 14th-century
- Script: Greek
- Now at: Biblioteca Marciana
- Size: 28.5 cm by 20.5 cm

Lectionary 109, designated by siglum ℓ 109 (in the Gregory-Aland numbering) is a Greek manuscript of the New Testament, on parchment leaves. Palaeographically it has been assigned to the 14th-century.

== Description ==
The codex contains weekday lessons from the Gospels of John, Matthew, Luke lectionary (Evangelistarium) with lacunae. It is written in Greek minuscule letters, on 206 parchment leaves (28.5 cm by 20.5 cm), in 2 columns per page, 27 lines per page.

It contains pictures. Some leaves were supplied on paper.

== History ==
The manuscript was added to the list of New Testament manuscripts by Scholz. It was examined by Dean Burgon.

The manuscript is not cited in the critical editions of the Greek New Testament (UBS3).

Currently the codex is located in the Biblioteca Marciana (Gr. Z. 550 (848)) in Venice.

== See also ==
- List of New Testament lectionaries
- Biblical manuscript
- Textual criticism

== Bibliography ==
- Gregory, Caspar René (1900). Textkritik des Neuen Testaments. Vol. 1. Leipzig: J.C. Hinrichs. p. 397.
