= Lectionary 140 =

Lectionary ℓ 140
- New Testament manuscript
- Text: Evangelistarion
- Date: 13th century
- Script: Greek
- Now at: Biblioteca Marciana

Lectionary 140, designated by siglum ℓ 140 (in the Gregory-Aland numbering) is a Greek manuscript of the New Testament, on paper leaves. It was dated to the 13th century.

== Description ==
It is one of the manuscripts which was held in Biblioteca Marciana in time of Scholz. Probably it is still held there, though it is not certain what manuscript it is. The manuscript was examined and described by Scholz, who added it to the list of New Testament manuscripts. According to Scholz the manuscript was written in the 13th century, in quarto, on paper. It contains Lessons from the Gospels. Scholz did not give number of leaves, number of columns, number of lines in the column. He did not give size of the pages. According to him it was held in the Marcian Library under the catalogue number 286. Gregory suggested that it can concern the codex 270.

According to Scrivener the manuscript has no existence. He suggested to place another manuscript in its place instead. According to Aland it is an uncertain manuscript, which can not be identified with number of Catalog of Zanetti or Catalog of Castellani. Aland in his Kurzgefasste classified it under the number 140, place of its possible location he gave in the brackets: "(Venedig, Biblioteca Marciana, Gr. Z. 286 [626]).

The manuscript is not cited in the critical editions of the Greek New Testament (UBS3).

== See also ==
- List of New Testament lectionaries
- Biblical manuscript
- Textual criticism

== Bibliography ==
- J. M. A. Scholz, Biblisch-kritische Reise in Frankreich, der Schweiz, Italien, Palästine und im Archipel in den Jahren 1818, 1819, 1820, 1821: Nebst einer Geschichte des Textes des Neuen Testaments.
