= Lectionary 266 =

Lectionary ℓ 266
- New Testament manuscript
- Text: Evangelistarium
- Date: 12th century
- Script: Greek
- Now at: Biblioteca Marciana
- Size: 25.8 cm by 19.7 cm
- Note: musical notes

Lectionary 266, designated by siglum ℓ 266 (in the Gregory-Aland numbering) is a Greek manuscript of the New Testament, on parchment. Palaeographically it has been assigned to the 12th century. Scrivener labelled it as 172^{e}, Gregory by 158^{e}. The manuscript is lacunose.

== Description ==
The codex contains lessons from the Gospel of John, Matthew, and Luke (Evangelistarium), with two lacunae at the beginning and end.

The text is written in Greek large minuscule letters, on 50 parchment leaves (25.8 cm by 19.7 cm), in two columns per page, 22 lines per page. The initial letters are rubricated, it contains musical notes (in red).

The manuscript contains weekday Gospel lessons for Church reading from Easter to Pentecost and Saturday/Sunday Gospel lessons for the other weeks.

== History ==
Scrivener and Gregory dated the manuscript to the 12th century. It has been assigned by the Institute for New Testament Textual Research to the 12th century.

The manuscript was added to the list of New Testament manuscripts by Scrivener (number 172^{e}) and Gregory (number 266^{e}). Gregory saw the manuscript in 1886.

The manuscript is not cited in the critical editions of the Greek New Testament (UBS3).

The codex is housed at the Biblioteca Marciana (Gr. I.46 (1435)) in Venice.

== See also ==
- List of New Testament lectionaries
- Biblical manuscript
- Textual criticism
- Lectionary 268

== Bibliography ==
- Gregory, Caspar René (1900). Textkritik des Neuen Testaments, Vol. 1. Leipzig. p. 409.
