= Minuscule 354 =

- New Testament manuscript
- Text: Gospel of Matthew
- Date: 11th century
- Script: Greek
- Now at: Biblioteca Marciana
- Size: 24.5 cm by 16 cm
- Type: Byzantine text-type
- Category: V

Minuscule 354 (in the Gregory-Aland numbering), Θ^{ε13} (Soden), is a Greek minuscule manuscript of the New Testament, on parchment. Paleographically it has been assigned to the 11th century.

== Description ==
The codex contains the text of the Gospel of Matthew 1:1-27:66 on 442 parchment leaves (24.5 cm by 16 cm) with a Commentary of Theophylact. The text us written in one column per page, in 22 lines per page. It was written in a very large hand.

== Text ==
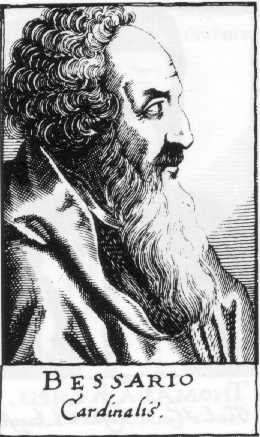
Cardinal Bessarion

The Greek text of the codex is a representative of the Byzantine text-type. Aland placed it in Category V.

== History ==
The manuscript was bought by Theodor Constantin, in 1415, in Constantinople. It once belonged to Cardinal Bessarion (as codices 205, 357). The manuscript was added to the list of New Testament manuscripts by Scholz (1794–1852). It was examined by Burgon. C. R. Gregory saw it in 1886.

The manuscript is currently housed at the Biblioteca Marciana (Gr. Z. 29) in Venice.

== See also ==
- List of New Testament minuscules
- Biblical manuscript
- Textual criticism
