= Vaughan Williams Memorial Library =

Library and archive

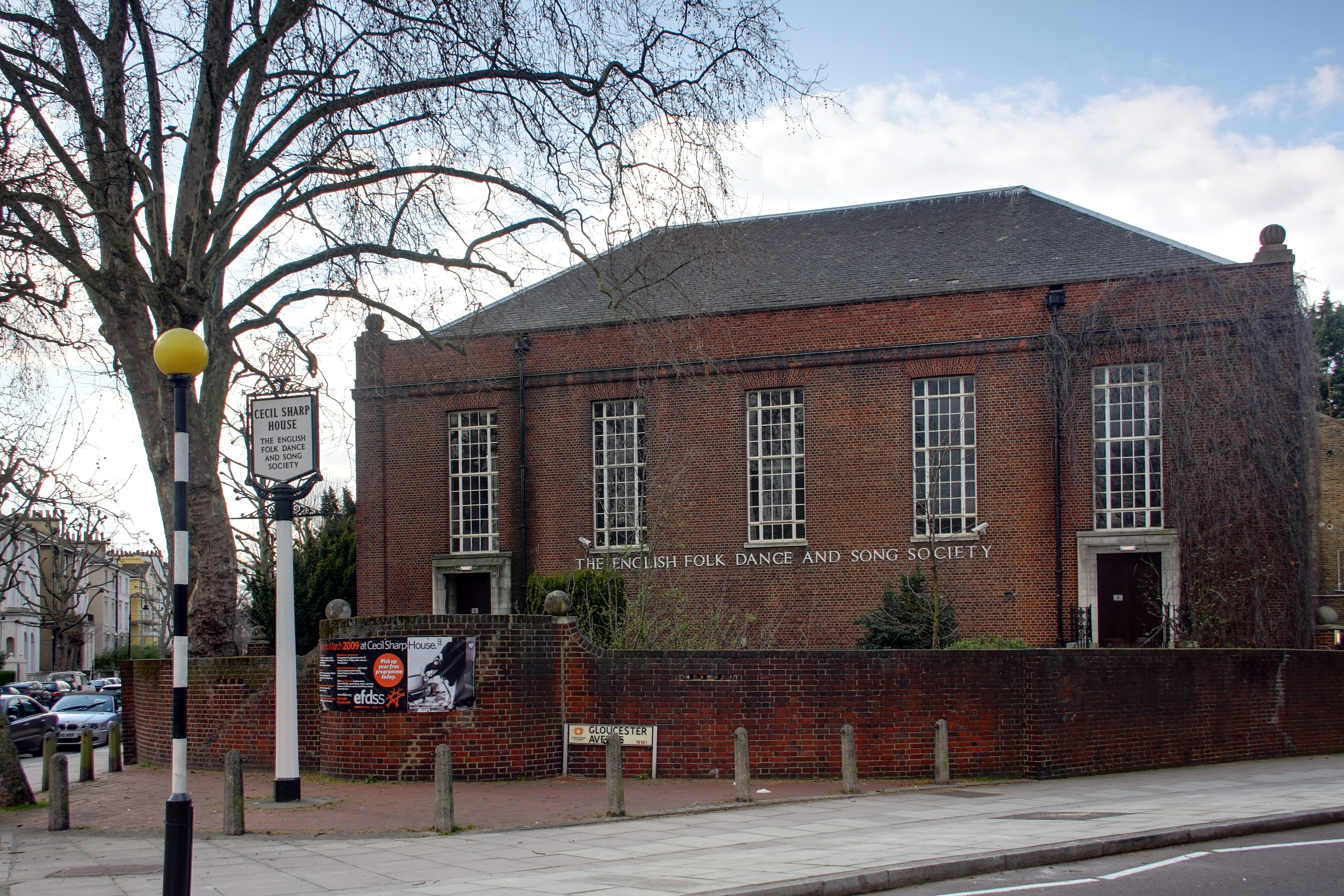
- Cecil Sharp House in Regent's Park, London, home to the English Folk Dance and Song Society
- 51.5381°N 0.1493°W

Other information
- Director: Tiffany Hore
- Website: www.vwml.org

The Vaughan Williams Memorial Library (VWML) is the library and archive of the English Folk Dance and Song Society (EFDSS), located in the society's London headquarters, Cecil Sharp House in Camden Town. It is a multi-media library comprising books, periodicals, audio-visual materials, photographic images and sound recordings, as well as manuscripts, field notes, transcriptions etc. of a number of collectors of folk music and dance traditions in the British Isles. According to A Dictionary of English Folklore, "... by a gradual process of professionalization the VWML has become the most important concentration of material on traditional song, dance, and music in the country."

Subjects covered include: Folk/traditional/popular song, Child Ballads, Broadside ballads, Industrial/occupational songs, sea songs/shanties, singing games, Nursery rhymes, Street cries, Carols/hymns, Rounds/glees/part songs, Music hall, Ritual/ceremonial dance, Morris dance/sword dance and a great deal more.

VWML regularly features a variety of conferences and events, including Broadside Day, Library Lectures, the Folk Song Conference, and Special Conferences. VWML has also published resources, including the Folk Music Journal.

== History ==
VWML was originally founded as the Cecil Sharp Library in 1930. Sharp's books constituted the bulk of the original library holdings. The first librarian was Joan, Sharp's daughter. In 1940, four bombs hit the Cecil Sharp House during World War II, but the library remained intact. When Ralph Vaughan Williams, composer, collector and past president of the EFDSS, died in 1958, the library was renamed in his honor. The building continued to be designated as the Cecil Sharp House. Over the years the library has added literature, sound and manuscript collections of other folklorists and collectors, such as Lucy Broadwood, Janet Blunt, Anne Gilchrist, George Butterworth, the Hammond brothers and George Gardiner. It also contains copies of the papers and notebooks of Sabine Baring-Gould, Ralph Vaughan Williams, Alfred Williams and James Madison Carpenter; and the field recordings of Percy Grainger, Mike Yates and the BBC Folk Music Archive. From 1979 to 2012, Malcolm Taylor served as the librarian, and then Director, of VWML.

In 2010, VWML received an excellence award by the International Association of Music Libraries, Archives and Documentation Centres (IAML) and in 2011 received designated status by the Museums, Libraries and Archives Council (MLA). In 2017, the library was renovated for the first time since the 1940s.

== Online Archive ==
In May 2006, VWML Online was launched which hosts a number of the library's indexes to manuscript collections, together with its index to mummers' plays and the Roud Folk Song and Broadside Indexes, the largest of their kind in the English language. The online material has been extended with the addition of a catalogue of the collection of books bequeathed by eminent folk music scholar Leslie Shepard. In addition, both Cecil Sharp's Appalachian diaries from 1915-1918 (in manuscript and transcript form) and over 300 images taken from his photographic collection are available for viewing on-line. The latter are largely portraits of contributors to his music collections from North America and England.

In 2007, EFDSS was awarded a grant, which led to the creation of the Take 6 archive. This archive features of six of the most prominent folk song collections of EFDSS, including the Janet Blunt Collection, the George Butterworth Collection, the Francis Collinson Collection, the George Gardiner Collection, the Anne G. Gilchrist Collection, and the Hammond Collection.

In 2014, EFDSS partnered with English museums and cultural heritage institutions and launched The Full English Archive, the largest online archive in the world of English folk manuscripts. The Full English is currently integrated into the online archives of VWML. The Take 6 archive was also integrated into The Full English.

From 2017 to 2018, folk works collected by James Madison Carpenter were digitized from the Library of Congress and added to the VWML archives as the Carpenter Folk Online.

In 2019, the Folk Song Subject Index went live, which features an "online subject index for folk songs along with a thesaurus of keywords" and is an ongoing project of the VWML.
