= John Rhosos =

Greek scribe

John Rhosos or Rhosus (active 1447–1497, d. Feb. 1498) was a Greek Cretan scribe and calligrapher who lived and worked in 15th century Renaissance Italy. He copied and translated works of Classical literature in Venice, Florence, Rome and other cities of Italy. He worked for Bessarion and is considered by some to be one of the most important Greek copyists of the Renaissance.

== Known works ==
- Homer's Odyssey – transcription
- Minuscule 448

== See also ==
- Greek scholars in the Renaissance
