= Lectionary 268 =

Lectionary ℓ 268
- New Testament manuscript
- Name: Nanianus
- Text: Evangelistarium
- Date: 12th century
- Script: Greek
- Now at: Biblioteca Marciana
- Size: 26.5 cm by 20.5 cm
- Note: apocryphal material

Lectionary 268, designated by siglum ℓ 268 (in the Gregory-Aland numbering) is a Greek manuscript of the New Testament, on parchment. Palaeographically it has been assigned to the 12th century. Scrivener labelled it as 174^{e}, Gregory by 268^{e}. The manuscript has complex contents. Formerly it was known as Nanianus 169.

== Description ==
The codex contains lessons from the Gospel of John, Matthew, and Luke (Evangelistarium). It contains some lessons from the Old Testament. Some apocryphal material about Joseph the spouse Maria's was added by a later hand.

The text is written in Greek large minuscule letters, on 281 parchment leaves (26.5 cm by 20.5 cm), in two columns per page, 20 lines per page.

The manuscript contains weekday Gospel lessons from Easter to Pentecost and Saturday/Sunday Gospel lessons for the other weeks.

== History ==
Scrivener and Gregory dated the manuscript to the 12th century. It is presently assigned by the INTF to the 12th century.

The manuscript was added to the list of New Testament manuscripts by Scrivener (number 174^{e}) and Gregory (number 268^{e}). Gregory saw the manuscript in 1886.

The manuscript is not cited in the critical editions of the Greek New Testament (UBS3).

Currently the codex is housed at the Biblioteca Marciana (Gr. I.48 (1199)) in Venice.

== See also ==
- List of New Testament lectionaries
- Biblical manuscript
- Textual criticism

== Bibliography ==
- Gregory, Caspar René (1900). Textkritik des Neuen Testaments. Vol. 1. Leipzig: Hinrichs. p. 410.
