= Giovanni Luigi Mingarelli =

Italian scholar

Giovanni Luigi or Giovanni Aloysius Mingarelli (22 February 1722 – Bologna 10 mars 1793) was an Italian scholar in the Greek language, who translated Greek and Coptic religious texts, including the Bible.

== Biography ==
Mingarelli was born at Bologna on 27 February 1722. He held important offices in the congregation of the regular canons of San Salvatore and was appointed professor of Greek literature at the Sapienza University of Rome. He died at Rome on 6 March 1793.

== Works ==
- Veterum Patrum Latinorum opuscula numquam antehac edita (Bologna, 1751).
- Sopra un'opera inedita d'un antico teologo (Venice, 1763; reprinted in the Nuova Raccolta Calogerana, tom. 11), a learned commentary on a Greek treatise on the Trinity ascribed to Didymus the Blind.
- Ægyptiorum Codicum Reliquiæ Venetiis In Bibliotheca Naniana Asservatæ (ibid. 1785, 2 parts), an edition and translation of the Coptic manuscripts in the library of Giacomo Nani in Venice.

Mingarelli edited Marco Marini's Annotationes literales in Psalmos of (Bologna, 1748-50); he added a life of the author, praised by Tiraboschi for its exactitude.

== Works ==
- Veterum Patrum latinorum opuscula nunquam antehac edita, Bologna, 1751.
- Anecdotorum fasciculus, sive S. Paulini Nolani, Anonymi scriptoris, Alani magni ac Theophylacti opuscula aliquot, nunc primum edita, etc., Rome, 1766.
- Epistola IV° sæculo conficta et a Basilio Magno sæpius commemorata, etc., in Nuova raccolta Calogerana, vol. 33.
- Sopra un’opera inedita d’un antico teologo, Lettera, etc., Venice, 1763.
- Græci codices manuscripti apud Nanios patricios Venetos asservati, Bologna, 1784.
- Ægyptiorum codicum reliquiæ Venetiis in Bibliotheca Naniana asservatæ, ibid., 1785, 2 voll.

== Bibliography ==
- This article incorporates public domain material from McClintock, John; Strong, James (1867–1887). Cyclopædia of Biblical, Theological and Ecclesiastical Literature. Harper and Brothers.
