= Folk play =

European theatrical performance

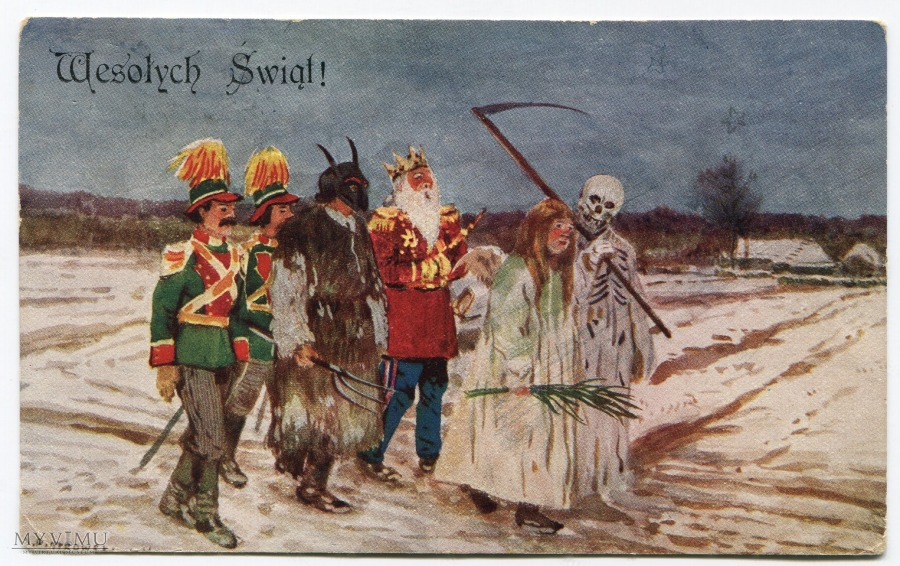
A mummers play in Poland

Folk plays such as Hoodening, Guising, Mummers Play and Soul Caking are generally verse sketches performed in countryside pubs in European countries, private houses or the open air, at set times of the year such as the Winter or Summer solstices or Christmas and New Year. Many have long traditions, although they are frequently updated to retain their relevance for contemporary audiences.

With the rise in folklore studies as an academic discipline, research into folk plays has increased. Notable organizations in this area (in the UK in particular, often centred on Yorkshire) have included:

- Centre for English Cultural Tradition and Language (CECTAL), founded in 1975 based on prior research programmes, inside the University of Sheffield's Department of English
- Institute of Dialect and Folklife Studies (IDAFS, part of Leeds University, closed in 1984)
- National Centre for English Cultural Tradition (NATCECT, new name for CECTAL since 1997; run by Joan C. Beal and Professor John D.A. Widdowson; had a Traditional Heritage Museum; no longer active: the archives were passed to Sheffield University's Archives of Cultural Tradition)
- Institute of Folklore Studies (off-shoot of NATCECT in both Britain and Canada, founded in 1986)
- Folklore Department at the Memorial University of Newfoundland (FDMUN)
- Centre for English Traditional Heritage (CETH, run by John Widdowson - see under NATCECT above)
- Traditional Drama Research Group (TDRG, run by Duncan Broomhead)
- Master Mummers (offshoot of the TDRG, run by Peter Millington)
- Centre for Contemporary Legend (CCL, part of Sheffield Hallam University)
- Sussex Centre for Folklore Fairy Tales and Fantasy (SCFFTF, part of the University of Chichester)
- Vaughan Williams Memorial Library (VWML, part of the English Folk Dance and Song Society, EFDSS).

In addition, although the Morris dance has no direct link with folk plays, members of the Morris Federation, Open Morris and Morris Ring often perform mumming plays on the side.
