= Blackface and Morris dancing =

Cultural dispute involving the English folk dance

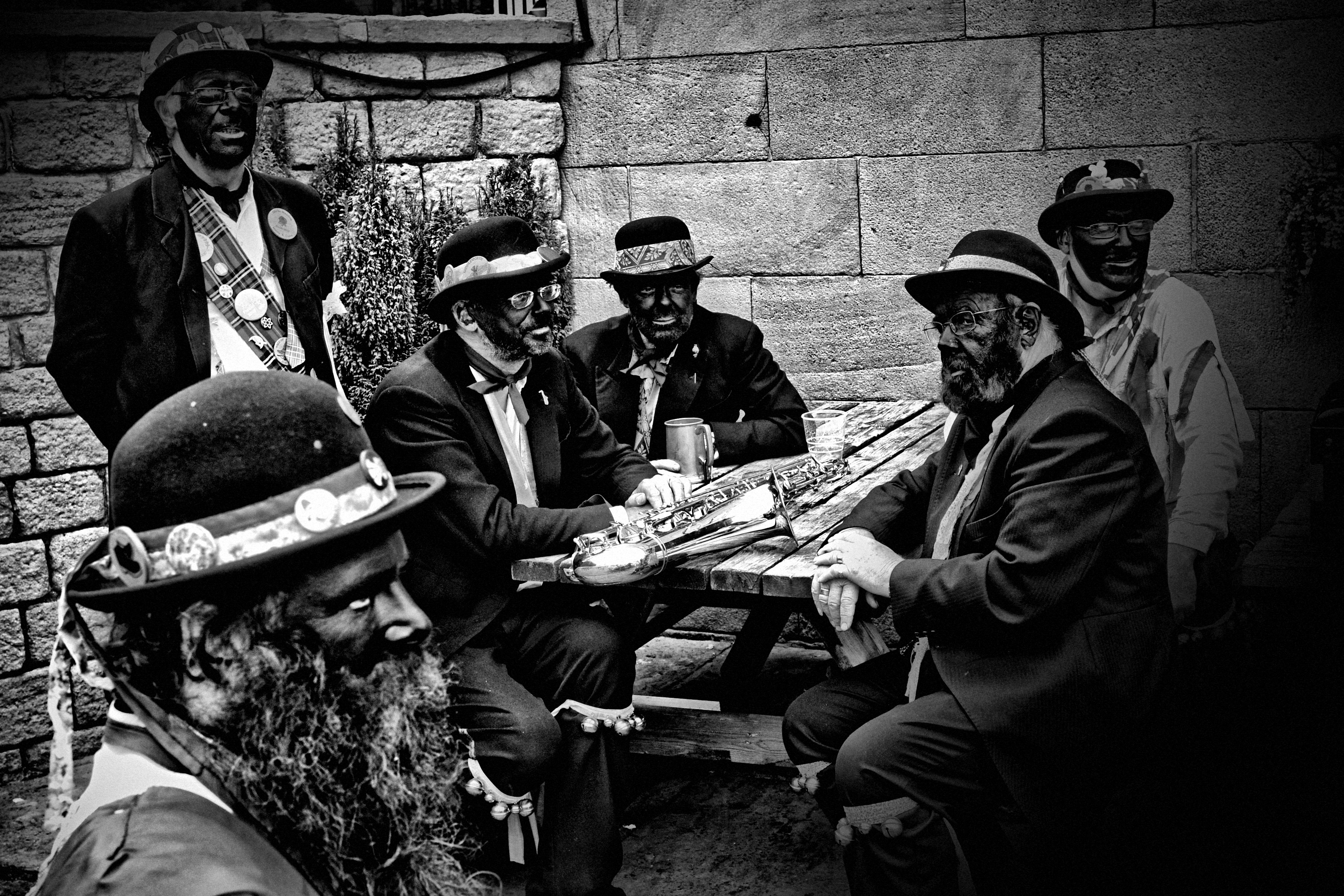
Silurian Border Morris Men, at Saddleworth Rushcart, August 2013

Multiple theories exist about the origins of the theatrical practice of blackface as a caricature of black people. One interpretation is that it can be traced back to traditions connected with Morris dancing. Another interpretation is that traditionally the use of soot to blacken faces in morris dancing was derived from its use as a disguise by the poor when seeking food through begging or poaching.

== 15th-century Moorish mimicry ==
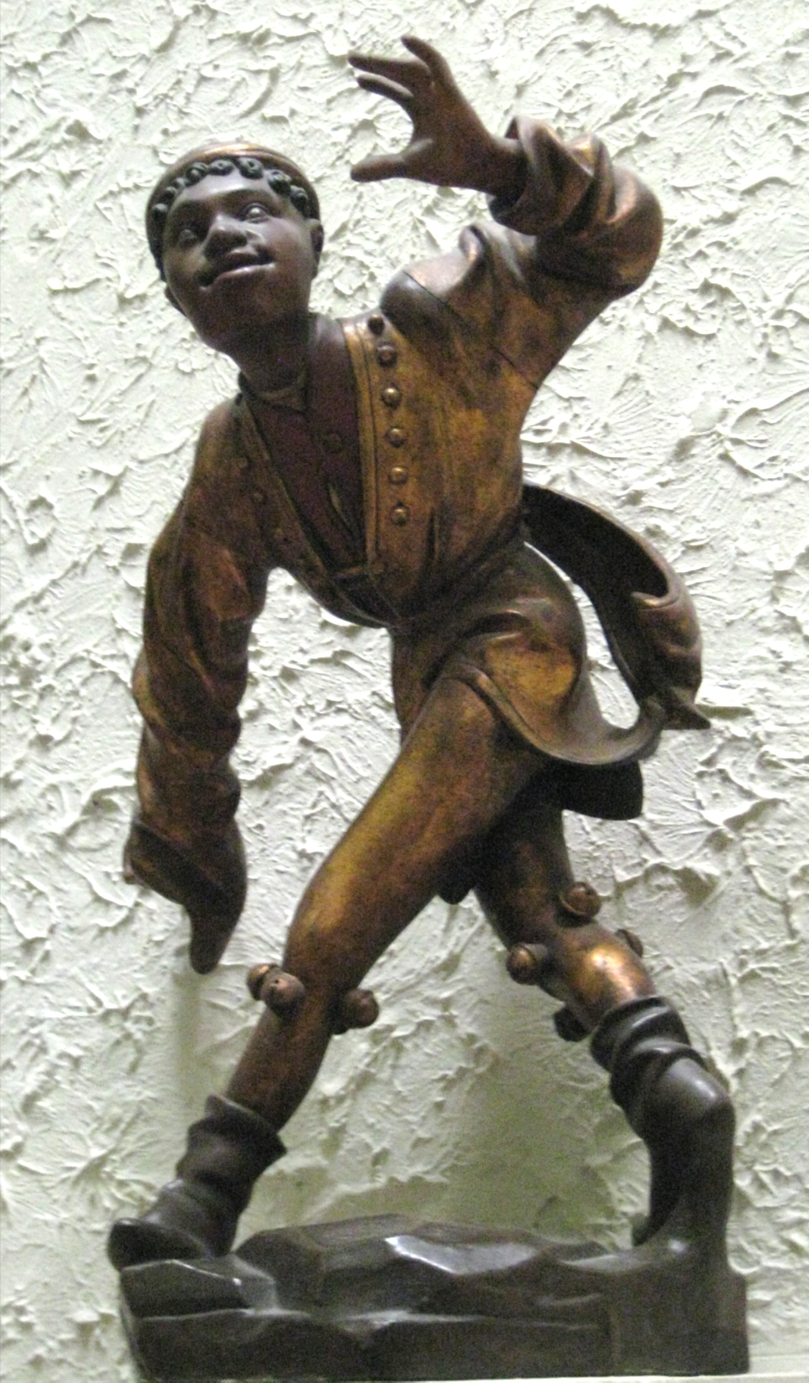
A small statue of a "Moriskentänzer" made by Erasmus Grasser in 1480 for Old Townhall in Munich, one of a set of 16, of which only 10 remain. This dancer has an appearance which would be described at the time as "moorish", but all the other 9 surviving carvings are fairer-skinned. All wear bells on their legs.

The term morris is believed to be from the late Middle English word morys, a variant of the word moorish – from the Moors of Morocco; this explanation was cited as early as 1801.

Carved figures from 1480 in Munich, Germany, show "Moriskentänzer" with bells, including one of the ten extant having African features. Later evidence from France includes this quote from Thoinot Arbeau circa 1580: "In fashionable society when I was young, a small boy, his face daubed with black and his forehead swathed in a white or yellow handkerchief, would make an appearance after supper. He wore leggings covered with little bells and performed a morris". However, the precise linkage between the morris in France and England at that time remains unclear. Henry VII may have become familiar with French morris during his time in France, and is recorded as having morris at his own court in England (see below).

Another theory is that the blackface tradition derives from earlier forms of the dance involving a Moroccan king and his followers. There is recorded evidence from 1688 of payments in Shrewsbury of 10 shillings to "Ye Bedlam Morris" and 2 shillings for "Ye King of Morocco".

Evidence of the 18th-century association of black faces with morris is given by the description of the Betley Window (a stained-glass window in Betley Hall, Staffordshire, from around 1621, depicting morris dancers) by its owner, George Tollet (1725–1779). Writing in 1778, he states "we are authorised ... to call some of the representations on my window, Morris Dancers, though I am uncertain whether it exhibits one Moorish personage, as none of them have black or tawny faces, nor do they brandish swords or staves in their hands, nor are they, in their shirts adorned with ribbons."

Gallop (1934) questions the Moorish link, quoting both Douce and Cecil Sharp who felt the English dance was too dissimilar in style and appearance to be derived from the continental European Moorish dances believed to be of Moorish origin. Sharp himself appears to have changed his view between 1906, when he saw a link between the black faces of English morris and the dancers on the Franco–Spanish border, and 1912, when he viewed the dance to be a pan-European custom possibly corrupted by Moorish influence. He argued that the name Moorish was used as a description of an existing earlier tradition, not because the dancers represented Moors. Gallop goes on to examine the linkage between the English morris dance and the mouriscada or moresca dances of Spain and Portugal, which involve ritual, choreographed battles between the Christians and Moors, often to music, involving swords and handkerchiefs. Gallop asks whether the Christian–Moorish link is actually a later interpretation of earlier pagan mock battles between Summer and Winter, such as that fought on May Day on the Isle of Man between the Queens of Summer and Winter. He argues that in parts of Portugal and the Basque Country, the word moor is also used to mean 'pagan', and that perhaps morris dance originally meant 'pagan dance', and that bells and disguised faces are a common feature of pagan ritual. Thus, for Gallop, the Moorish link is coincidental and the true origins are much older and pagan. This view remains popular for many today.

== Disguise ==
Blackface and disguise, often in a pagan themed context have their own history which intersects with morris tradition. There is evidence from the 1450s onward of the blackening of faces with charcoal as a means to evade identification, and in association with pagan themes. In the Kent and Essex enclosure riots of 1450–51 men cross-dressed as 'Queen of the Fairies' (similar to the related Doamna Zînelor, of the Călușari) including those wearing blackface.

An event which took place in the autumn of 1450 illustrates well the way in which the often separate activities of poaching and protest could on occasion conflate. On October 1450 a large group of men entered the duke of Buckingham's park at Penshurst in Kent and carried off eighty-two deer. Thirty-two men, nineteen of them yeomen, were named in subsequent indictment which made clear that a good number had escaped by its claim that there had been a total of a hundred present (not a figure to be taken too literally). These armed men had charcoaled faces, wore long false beards and withheld their names, calling themselves servants of the Queen of the Fairies.

The Rebels' Proclamation of 1489 following on the 1486 Poaching Act, provides another contemporary example of disguise in social unrest and the reaction it caused.

In a letter of May 1489 to his brother John Paston III, William Paston III included a copy of the proclamation issued by the rebels shortly after the murder of the earl of Northumberland. Addressing the 'Northe partys of England', this proclamation summoned 'euery lorde, knyght, esquyer, gentylman, and yeman' to array themselves 'for to geynsstonde suche persons as is abowtward for to dystroy owre suffereyn lorde the Kynge and the Comowns of Engelond for suche vnlawfull poyntys as Synt Thomas of Cauntyrbery dyed for'. Becket could have been invoked because of his reputed championing of the interests of the poor, or because of his defence of ecclesiastical privileges. Such interpretations assume that 'vnlawfull' was a hostile interpolation made by William of Paston or his source, yet Becket's martyrdom was universally admired: a more conventional invocation of Becket during the protests in Kent in 1496 paired him with St George. Moreover, the proclamation was issued in the name of a local hobgoblin, 'Mayster Hobbe Hyrste, Robyn God-felaws brodyr'. Protesters adopted such fictive personas not only to conceal identity but also perhaps to associate their grievances with Everyman and to invoke a popular culture of misrule. Elsewhere we find a 'queen of the fairies' leading a rising and her 'servants' poaching; indeed, the first 'black act' against poaching when disguised passed in 1486.

Barbara Lowe's (1957) review of early records of the morris in England cites one of the earliest recorded mentions of the morris in England, with Henry VII paying "Master Wentworth £6 13s. 4d. 'towards the making of a disguising for a morysse'" in September 1501. She goes on to describe later accounts of Henry VIII's Shrovetide banquet for ambassadors in 1509, in which the torchbearers "were appareyled in crymosen satyne and grene lyke Moreskoes, their faces blacke". The following year, in 1510, "there was a Pageant like a mountain, out of which came a Lady of Gold, and the children of honour called the Henchemen, which were freshly disguysed, and danced a Morice before the Kyng".

Lowe (1957) also quotes from The Booke of all maner of Orders concerning an Erles House, dating from around 1510, which provides rules for "plays, interludes and disguisings, including Morrises" and states, "If a Morris is to be performed, it should take place after the disguising". Thus the link to blackened faces, and between morris dance and disguise, is clearly established by the early 16th century, although the nature of that disguise is broader than simply a black face, and includes all manner of elaborate costumes.

E. C. Cawte's (1963) work on morris dancing in Herefordshire, Shropshire and Worcestershire quotes A History of Shrewsbury regarding the Visitation at St. Mary's Parish Church, Shrewsbury, in 1584, when it was asked, "Whether there have bene any lords of mysrule, or somer lords and ladies, or any disguised persons, as morice dancers, maskers or mumm'ers, or such lyke, within the parishe, ether in the nativititide or in som'er, or at any other tyme, and what be their names?" It is thus clear that in Shrewsbury, on the Welsh border, morris dancers were associated with disguise in the 16th century.

The explanation of disguise is also given for the blackface in the later periods, and that during the hard winters of the 17th and 18th century, out of work labourers and builders sought to anonymously supplement their income by a bit of dancing and begging. The use of blackface as a form of disguise is established in early 18th-century England. In 1723 it became a capital offence under the Waltham "Black Act" to appear "in disguise, either by mask or by blackened face". Certainly by the 17th century, border morris seems to have degenerated into a source of public nuisance, as many of Lowe's (1957) primary accounts recall.

== 19th-century minstrelsy ==
Chloe Metcalfe (2013) and Richard Carlin (2008) question the link between the American minstrel shows into Victorian England in the late 1830s and the morris. By the early 20th century, border morris dancing was referred to colloquially by some as "nigger dancing" or "going niggering". Some view this as direct evidence of the link with minstrel shows.

Theresa Buckland's (1990) research details the linkages between the 19th-century Lancashire Britannia Coconut Dancers and minstrel shows, although it does not discuss any link to Welsh border morris. She argued, "The 'disguise' function of the costume has most likely been influenced by Cecil Sharp's [1911] interpretation of the black face [...] which has been repeated in various publications and ephemera of the English Folk Dance and Song Society ... The dancers have been exposed to information from these publications, whether first-hand or further removed." The argument of disguise is used to "explain away" the blackface, while the black faces of dancers have radically different symbolic potential than that of the faces of supposedly disguised labourers.

According to the American Morris News (2005), "It is most commonly thought that the origin and function of blackface in Morris dancing lies in primitive disguise rather than an imitation of black men. However, this is not definitely the case. Accounts of the Morris of Shakespeare's time make no mention of blackface, while the border teams contemporary with minstrel shows typically blacked up. American minstrel shows, if not the actual origin of blackface among Morris dancers, at least contributed to its popularity."

== Modern interpretations ==
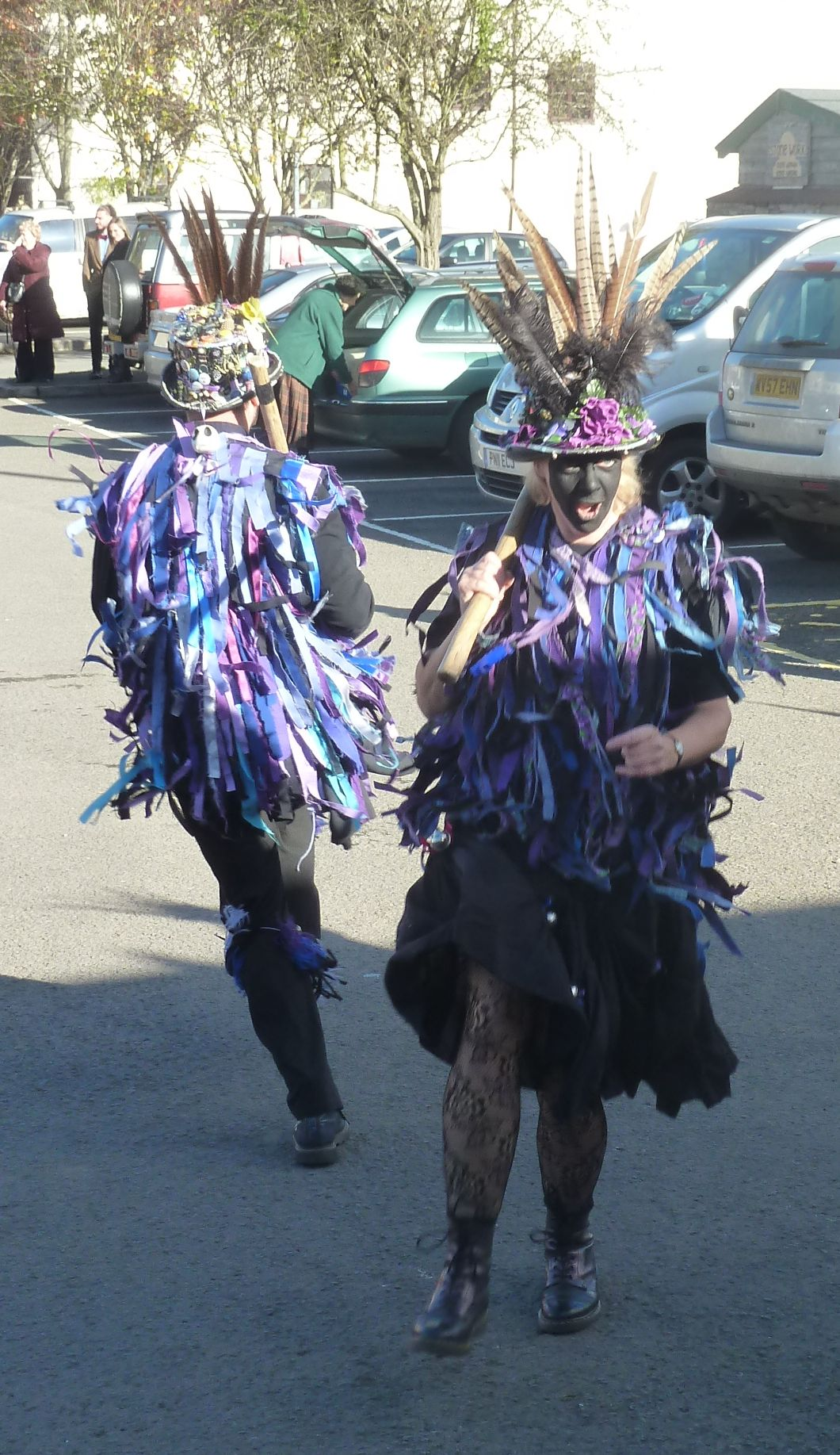
The Widders dancing at Chepstow Apple Day, 2013

Canadian academic Pauline Greenhill, commenting on morris dancing in Canada, writes that

[...] it seems unlikely that North American audiences, who encounter Morris at dance-outs at local shopping centres, pubs, and so on, far from geographical associations with coal miners, would see in blackface dances anything other than a white peoples' representation of black culture. Unfamiliar with the localised and historicised explanations of Morris tradition used by dancers, audiences might historically contextualise blackface in terms of entertainment forms such as vaudeville and view it in light of the overtly or covertly racist ideas associated with these practices. Or they might locate it in a slightly more up-to-date scenario of riots and gangs.

In an ethnographic study of Morris dancing, Greenhill states that the blackface practices of other English dances "only underscores the colonial complicity of Morris, particularly for non-English, nonwhite audiences."

It is possible that the interpretation of the blackface changed over the centuries – from Moroccan mimicry, to disguise, to a minstrel-inspired costume and back to disguise. To avoid controversy, some modern sides wear masks or colour their faces in different colours.

== Current reception ==
Regardless of the historical basis for black face disguise in border morris, the practice has become increasingly controversial. Although initially confined to specific folk events or newspaper articles, the issue was brought into focus by the rapidly changed social awareness following the George Floyd Protests and growing international impact of the Black Lives Matter movement. This led to the Morris Ring issuing a statement on 3 July 2020.

This was in part motivated by an opinion piece written by the UK far-right organisation Patriotic Alternative on 1 July 2020, encouraging their followers to take up Morris Dancing (of all kinds, not specifically Border Morris) and rejected in a statement the following day by the Joint Morris Organisation.

On 3 July 2020, the Joint Morris Organisation, representing the Morris Federation, the Morris Ring and Open Morris, issued a press statement to The Telegraph newspaper in the UK, stating,

Our traditions do not operate in a vacuum. While no morris dancer wants to cause offence, we must recognise that full face black or other skin tone makeup is a practice that has the potential to cause deep hurt.

Morris is a living tradition and it is right that it has always adapted and evolved to reflect society. Over the past few years, many morris teams have already proactively taken the decision to stop using full face black makeup to avoid causing offence or hurt. We now believe we must take further steps to ensure the continued relevance and inclusivity of the tradition.

The Joint Morris Organisations (The Morris Federation, The Morris Ring, and Open Morris) have therefore agreed that each of them will take action to eliminate this practice from their membership. Teams that continue to use full face black or other skin tone make up will find they are no longer part of the mainstream morris community, be covered by JMO public liability insurance, or invited to take part in events organised or sponsored by the JMO.

Morris is a unique cultural tradition of which we should be rightly proud. We want people from all races and backgrounds to share in this pride and not be made to feel unwelcome or uncomfortable by any element of a performance.

== See also ==
- Mummers plays
