= Hong Kong Morris =

Hong Kong organisation for morris dance

The Hong Kong Morris (Chinese: 香港莫利斯舞蹈團, Cantonese pronunciation: Heung Gong Mok Lee Si Mo Dou Tuen, literally the Hong Kong Morris Dance Platoon) is an English morris dancing team or side founded in Hong Kong in 1974. The side now has two chapters, the Hong Kong Morris and the Hong Kong (UK) Morris, colloquially known as The Brackets, in the United Kingdom. In its heyday, in the late 1980s and early 1990s, the Hong Kong Morris was one of the largest Cotswold morris sides in the world. The side maintains that it is committed to the principles of multiculturalism and inclusivity, and has always encouraged a multicultural membership and mixed dancing. The return of the former British colony of Hong Kong to China in 1997 has had no effect on the side's activities, and it continues to flourish as a notable example of the resilience of Western cultural activity in postcolonial Hong Kong.

== Early history ==
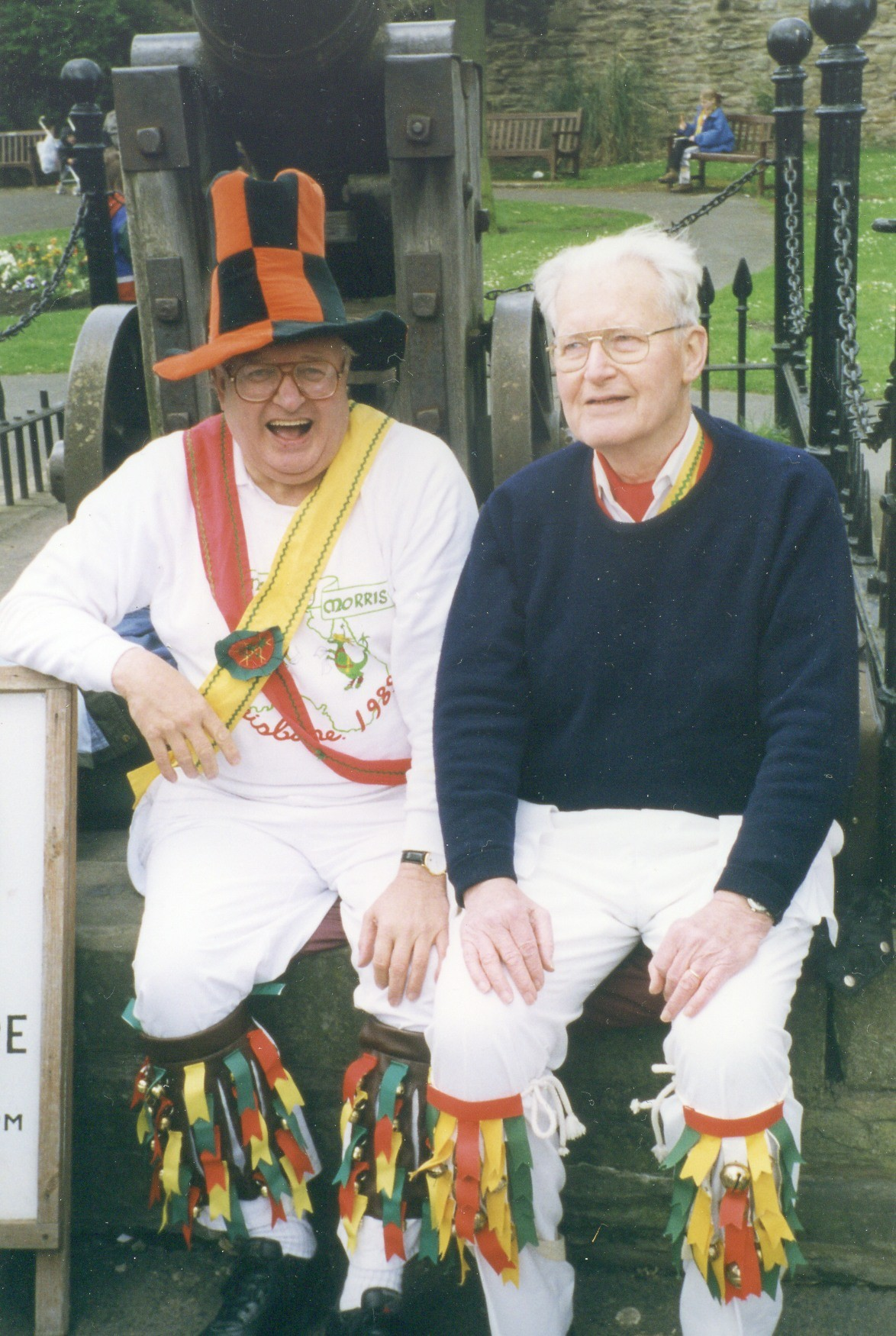
Hong Kong Morris founder members Jim Carter (left) and Tony Reynolds

The Hong Kong Morris was founded by Jim Carter in 1974. Many of its early members were officers of the Royal Hong Kong Police Force. One founding member, Tony Reynolds, was a Quaker who had driven ambulances along the Burma Road during the Second World War. The side met to practice at St John's Cathedral in Garden Road, Hong Kong Island. In the 1980s the side attracted British expatriates working in Hong Kong, teachers and engineers being particularly well represented. The side's numbers reached a peak in the mid-1980s, at around 50 dancers and musicians.

Due to the increase in the team's numbers the practice venue was moved in the early 1980s to South Island School. In 1985 the side was featured in the Morris Ring publication The Morris Tradition, as an example of the spread of morris dancing beyond its traditional home in England.

== Notable events ==
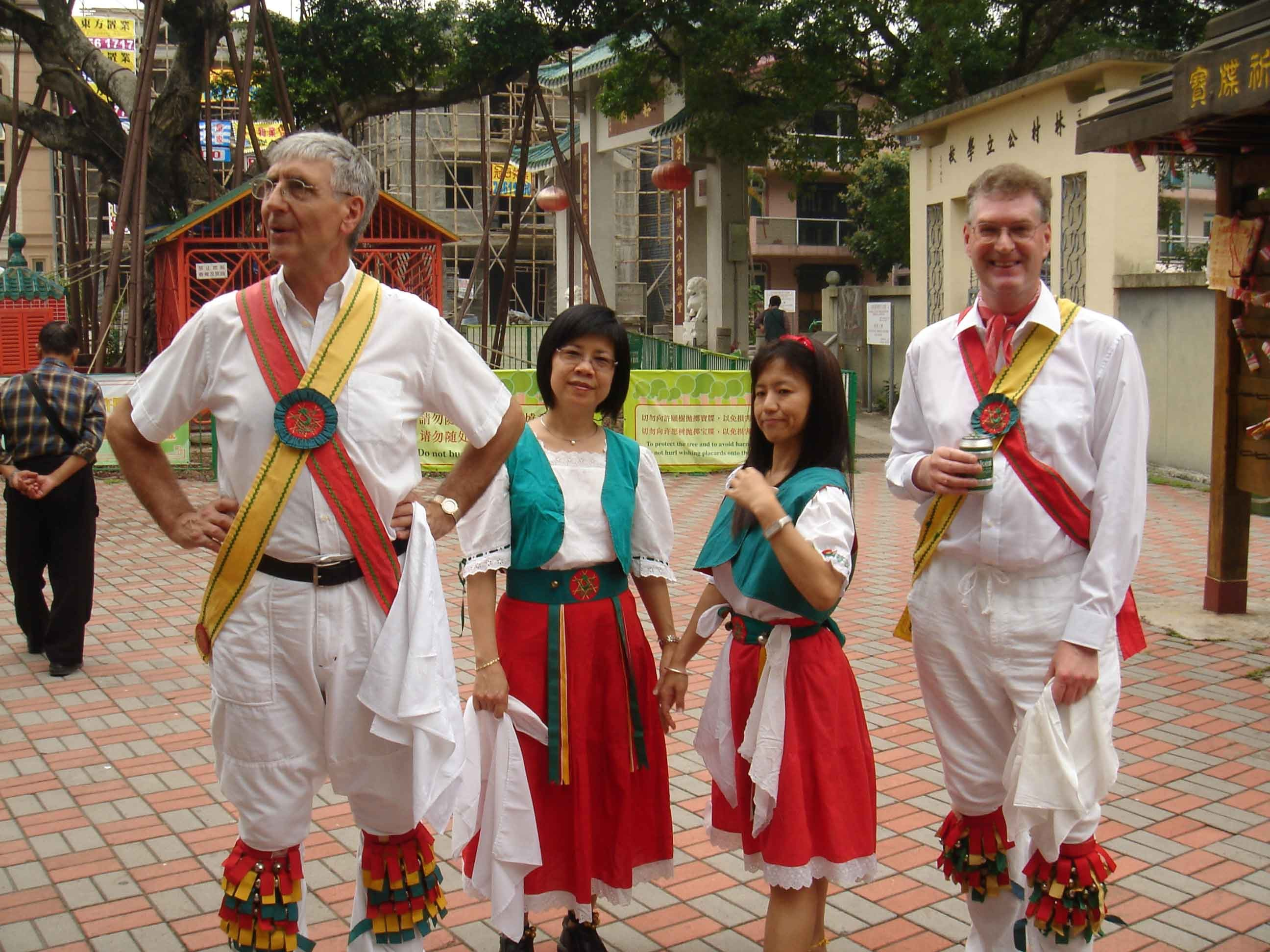
The Hong Kong Morris at the Wishing Tree, San Uk Tsai, May 2008

The side has typically danced either at open-air venues in Hong Kong such as fetes and festivals or in air-conditioned shopping malls. During the mid-1980s the Hong Kong Morris performed on most weekends, though in recent years performances have been less frequent.

In 1987 the side danced on top of a decorated shipping container swung out over Kwai Chung Creek on a crane to mark the opening of a new berth at Kwai Chung Container Terminals.

In 1988, in order to benefit from the waiver of fees granted by the Urban Council to charitable, religious and educational groups for the use of its premises, the Hong Kong Morris successfully argued that it was a religious group on the grounds that morris dancing was a survival of a pre-Christian fertility rite. This myth was exploded with the publication in 1999 of A History of Morris Dancing, John Forrest's magisterial study of the historical roots of morris dancing (no earlier than the fifteenth century), and is no longer an argument that the side could make with a good conscience.

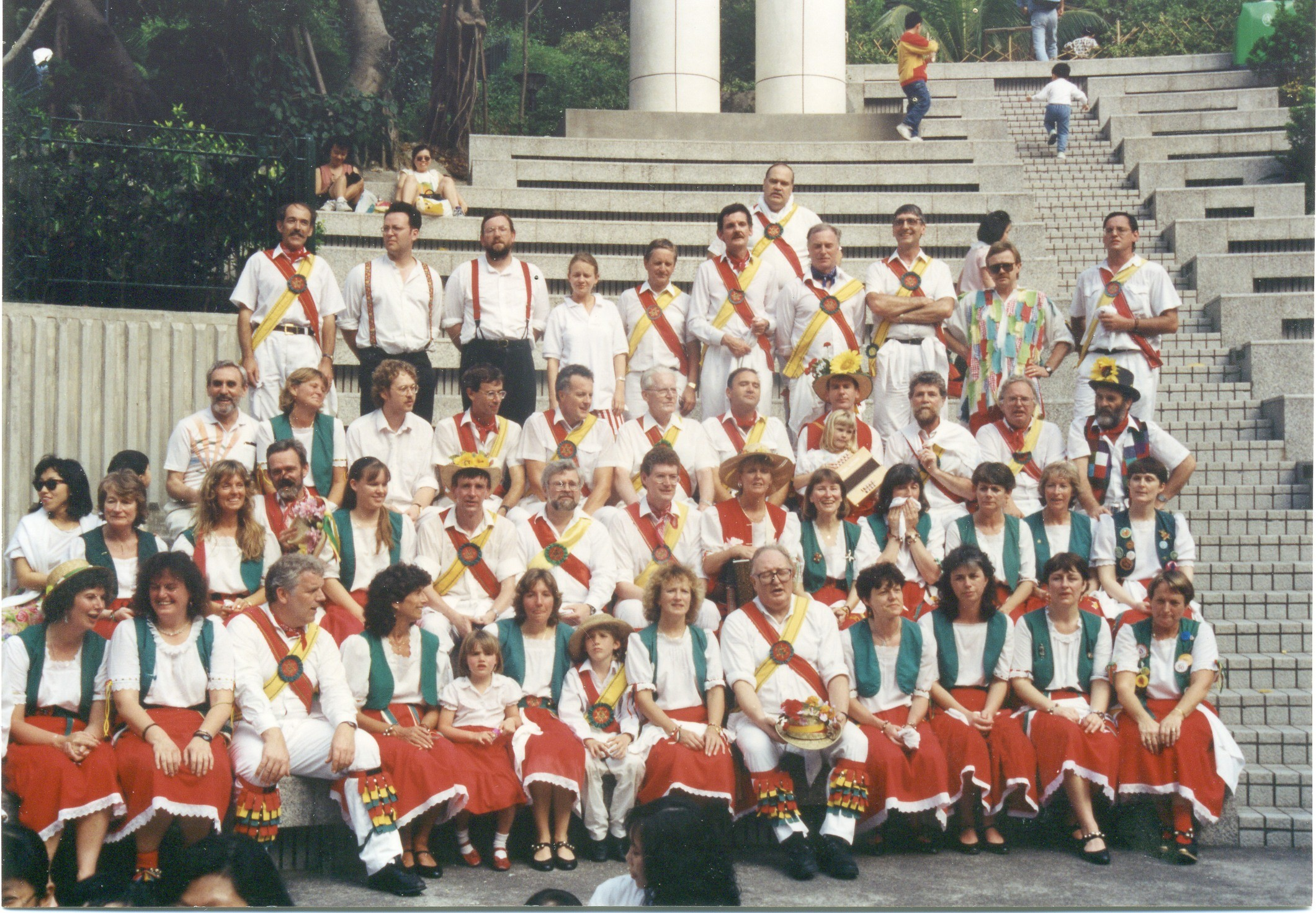
The Hong Kong Morris celebrates its twentieth anniversary in 1994 in Hong Kong Park. In the 1980s the team was one of the largest Cotswold morris sides in the world

In 1990 and 1991 three four-person teams from the Hong Kong Morris took part in the annual Trailwalker competition, an event that involves walking the 100 kilometres of the Maclehose Trail within a period of 48 hours. On both occasions the walkers changed into morris kit near the end of the trail, danced across the finishing line, and took part in a vigorous display of morris dancing afterwards.

In 1991 the side danced at Hei Ling Chau refugee camp. Its audience consisted of several hundred Vietnamese boat people who had fled from Vietnam and had been interned upon their arrival in Hong Kong.

In 1994 the side celebrated its twentieth anniversary in Hong Kong. A large number of former members returned to Hong Kong from the UK and Canada to take part in the celebrations.

In 1997, shortly before the handover of Hong Kong to China, the Hong Kong Morris held The Last Ale of the Empire.

In 2004 the side celebrated its thirtieth anniversary. Again, several former members returned to Hong Kong for the anniversary. The celebrations included dancing in Hong Kong Park, in Stanley, and outside the Cultural Centre in Tsim Sha Tsui.

In 2008 and 2009 the Hong Kong Morris celebrated May Morning by dancing next to the Wishing Tree in San Uk Tsai, a locally celebrated banyan tree believed to bring good fortune to its devotees.

== The Brackets ==
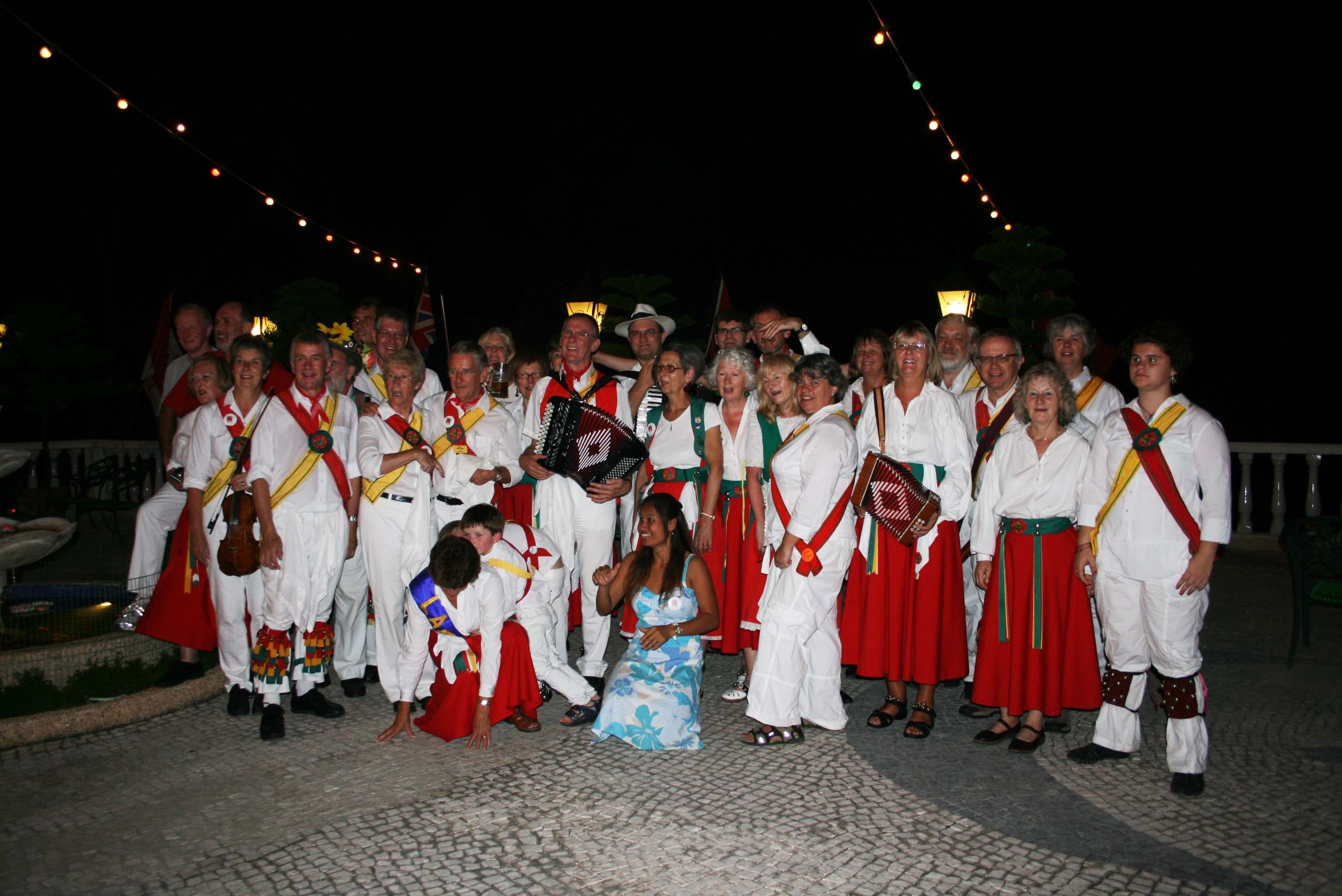
Hong Kong Morris and Brackets reunion in Macau, October 2008

In 1984 China and the United Kingdom issued a Joint Declaration providing for the return of Hong Kong to China in 1997. In the late 1980s, largely due to localisation policies implemented in preparation for the 1997 handover, many of the side's members returned to the United Kingdom. These members met for a weekend of dance at Wimborne, Dorset in 1991, at which the decision was taken to form the Hong Kong (UK) Morris, colloquially known as The Brackets. Initial Brackets gatherings took place at the annual Sidmouth Folk Festival in Devon, normally held at the end of July. In January 1993 a recently returned Hong Kong Morris member organised a weekend of dance for The Brackets and the Brackley Morris Men in Northamptonshire. The idea of a January gathering in addition to the July Sidmouth reunion caught on, and The Brackets now regularly meet and dance together in the first week of January as well as at Sidmouth.

Many of the Brackets became members of local morris sides after their return to the UK, but all retain an allegiance to the Hong Kong Morris. Throughout the 1990s members of the Hong Kong and UK sides met up annually at the Sidmouth Folk Festival, and links between the two sides remain strong. Many members of The Brackets returned to Hong Kong in 1994 to celebrate the 20th anniversary of the foundation of the Hong Kong Morris, and several Brackets members also helped to celebrate the side's 30th anniversary in 2004.

A strong side of Brackets visited Hong Kong in October 2008, and the local and UK sides danced together in Stanley, on Lamma Island and in Macau.

== Constitution and offices ==
The Hong Kong Morris is registered under the Societies Ordinance (Cap. 151 of the Laws of Hong Kong), a local ordinance introduced by the Hong Kong Government to counter the threat of subversion. The ordinance allows the government to monitor the activities of political parties, pressure groups and other potentially-undesirable combinations, and under its provisions the side is required to furnish the government every year with copies of its accounts and the minutes of its annual general meeting.

As with many other morris sides, the officers of the Hong Kong Morris include a squire (president), a bagman (treasurer) and a foreman (dance teacher). In 1989, in recognition of the wish of the women members to develop their own dance traditions, the office of foreman was replaced with a men's foreman and a women's foreman.

== Costume ==
The men's side of the Hong Kong Morris wear white trousers and shirts. Their baldricks, red and yellow with green highlights, are decorated with a badge, which was designed in 1976 by Sue King, representing a Chinese dragon behind a rapper sword knot. All three colours, but particularly red, are considered lucky in Chinese tradition, and drew attention away from the men's white shirts and trousers. White is the colour worn at funerals in China, and is considered inauspicious. This costume was lightly modified in 1984.

The Hong Kong Morris colour palette (red, yellow and green) influenced the costume of the Vancouver Morris Men , one of Canada's most illustrious morris sides. Graham Baldwin, one of the earliest members of the Hong Kong Morris, founded the Vancouver Morris Men in 1982, and chose the same colours for the costume of the Vancouver side.

The costume of the Hong Kong Morris women's side has undergone changes over the years. The first women's costume consisted of a white blouse and a skirt available in light green, russet brown, or pink. In 1984 this early costume was replaced with a uniform costume designed by Annette Frizell, consisting of a red skirt, a white blouse and a green waistcoat. At present many of the women dancers continue to wear the costume introduced in 1984, though some dancers prefer a modified open-neck version of the 1984-model white blouse. Other dancers wear the same costume as the men.

The sticks used by the side in its dances are wrapped in tape in three broad bands of colour: red, white and green. The green end of the stick is always held uppermost, so that any blood shed in an incautious stick clash is disguised by dripping onto the lower red band.

Many morris sides include one or more members dressed as animals, typically horses. The Hong Kong Morris has its own hobby horse named Horace, normally represented by Martin Samson.

== Dancing traditions ==
Most of the dances performed by the Hong Kong Morris are from the Cotswold Morris tradition. Cotswold traditions danced at various periods in the side's history include Adderbury, Ascot-under-Wychwood, Bampton, Bledington, Bucknell, Fieldtown, Headington, Lichfield, Stanton Harcourt and Upton-on-Severn. At periods in its history the side has also performed longsword dances, garland dances, rapper dances and mumming plays.

While the Hong Kong Morris has always regarded Lionel Bacon's classic work A Handbook of Morris Dances as a most valuable source of information on the form and historical development of particular morris tunes and morris dances, it has never felt the need to adhere slavishly to the particular form in which a dance or tune was collected several decades ago. The side has therefore contributed to the development of the morris tradition by adapting a number of existing dances to local circumstances. In the early 1980s the Hong Kong Morris developed a variant of the Lichfield Morris tradition, designed to be viewed from above when being danced on the circular ground-floor stage of the multi-storey shopping mall The Landmark. Instead of the conventional set of eight dancers, the Hong Kong Morris danced Lichfield with twelve dancers arranged in a cross formation. This formation enabled spectacular effects to be achieved, particularly in the complex Lichfield Hey. Other dances similarly adapted include the Upton-on-Yangtze stick dance, a version of the Upton-on-Severn stick dance performed in traditional Chinese costume with chopsticks, and Governor's Gallop, a dance developed in the early 1990s in honour of Chris Patten, Hong Kong's last British governor.

== Music ==
The main musicians for the Hong Kong side are Sue Ellis and Sue Papper (melodeons), and for the Brackets Steve Butler/Hall, John Bacon (both piano accordions), John Rowlands (button accordion) and June Rowlands (fiddle). The squeezebox and fiddle players normally carry the main burden of the tune, while attractive decorative effects are produced by supporting musicians with less powerful instruments. Bill Crump and Dave Ellis, for example, use the tin whistle to counterpoint and harmonise with the main melody. While most of the side's musicians play traditional morris instruments (the piano accordion, the button accordion, the melodeon, the concertina, the fiddle, the guitar, the bodhran and the tin whistle), the Hong Kong Morris has never refused less conventional instruments. The late Mike Cowley's inimitable performance on the trombone (Mike died on 18 November 2010) will be particularly missed, as it gave the side's music a depth and volume that considerably enhanced the performance of the dancers and at times reduced them to tears of laughter.

== Mumming play and rapper dancing ==
The Hong Kong Morris has for many years performed an English mumming play. Texts of a large number of medieval mumming plays have survived, and the play performed by the side is in the mainstream mumming play tradition. It contains the characters Father Christmas, Saint George and the Turkish Knight. In the late 1980s and early 1990s the mumming play actors also included a display of rapper sword dancing in their performance. The impact of these performances was considerably enhanced by the striking costumes produced for the actors by side member Chris Baldwin, a devotee of amateur dramatics.

== Singing ==
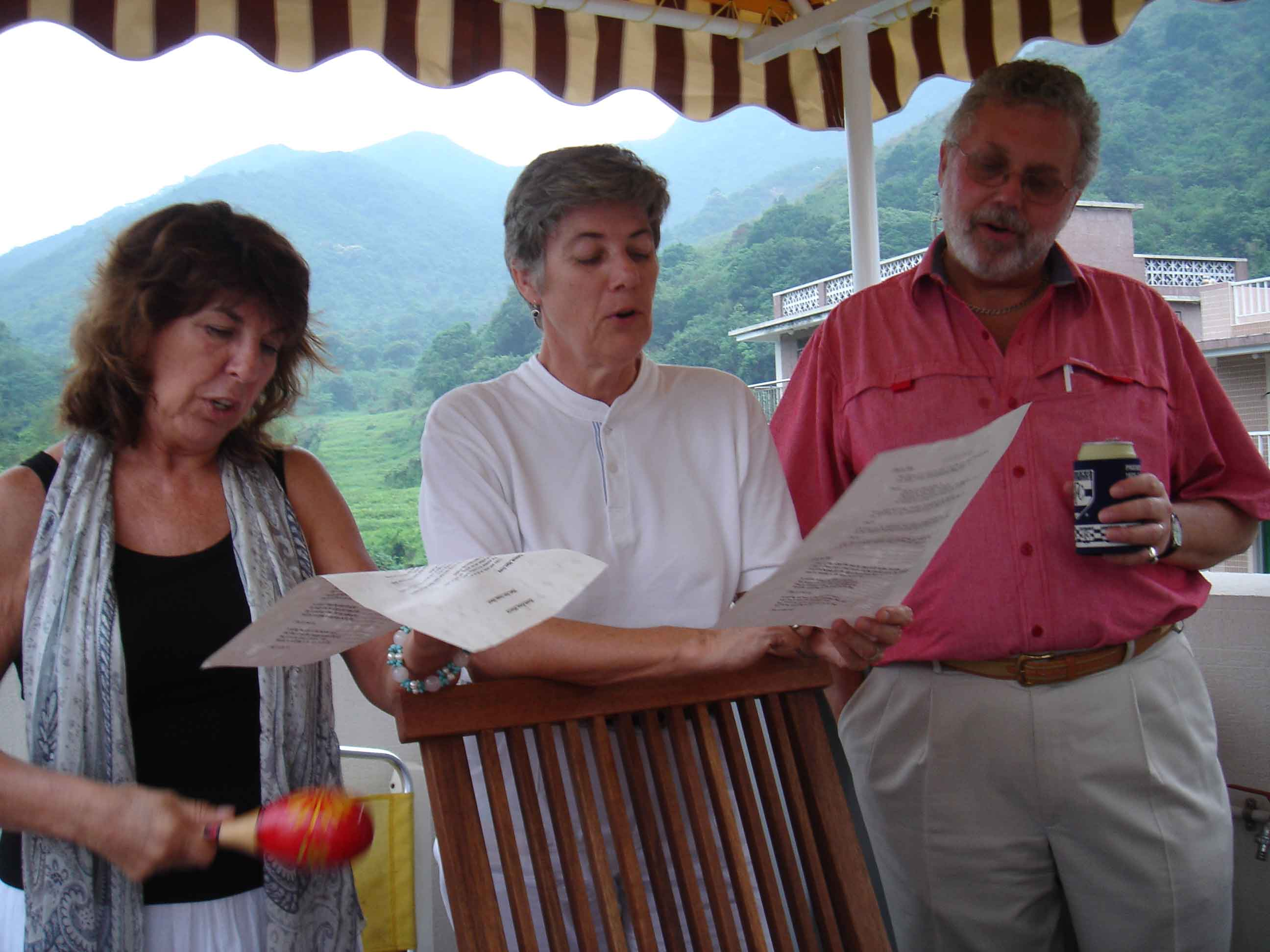
The Hong Kong Morris has always loved to sing: May Day celebrations, 2008

Singing (mostly of English folk songs) has always played a role in the apres-morris conviviality of the Hong Kong Morris. Jim Carter, Hilary Blythe and Phil Pimentil, three of the side's early members, were noted singers on the local folk scene as part of the group Mulled Ale, and launched a tradition of powerful singing. Several other regular singers have maintained this tradition, including Mary Read and Amy Hughes (romantic ballads), Mike Greenhalgh (sea shanties), Dave Wilmshurst ('Death to the French' songs), Steve Ford (folksong parodies) and Dave Ellis (drinking songs). Kyoko Fukuda has recently widened the side's singing repertoire with two songs sung in Japanese: one about an elephant, known as The Elephant Song, and one about something else, known jokingly as The Not-the-Elephant Song.

Phil Pimentil used to sing one of the few English folksongs known to have mentioned Hong Kong, about an Irish navvy who found work in the British colony in the late nineteenth century: 'I'm off to be a Chinaman, to Hong Kong I'm bound.' Another song with a China connection, The Chinese Bumboatman Song, also known as The Ballad of Wing Chang Loo, has become a side favourite, and is sometimes delivered with 'an horrible oath' (as the song requires) in Cantonese, depending on the company.

== Oratory ==
Audience engagement forms part of a Morris side's performance. Speakers who address the audience can influence how well a performance is received. In the early years of Hong Kong Morris, Jim Carter frequently performed this role. Later Roger Pope, previously a school head master, took on the duty. When the dancing for the Hong Kong Cantonese-speaking audiences, announcements are customarily given in Cantonese. Several of the side's expatriate members are able to speak enough Cantonese to make themselves understood for this purpose.

== Inclusivity and multiculturalism ==
The Hong Kong Morris attracted its first women members in the late 1970s, at a time when there was opposition to women's morris dancing in the United Kingdom. Women and men have always danced together in the Hong Kong Morris, either in mixed sets or in separate sets. By the mid-1980s the side's growing numbers enabled strong men's and women's sets to develop, and each set began to specialise in certain Cotswold traditions, while retaining a large common core of dances for mixed dancing. In 1989 a women's foreman was added to the side's officers. The Hong Kong Morris was briefly a member side of the Morris Ring, but was asked to leave the Ring because of its inclusive policy on women's dancing (the Morris Ring has since dropped its gender bar). It is now a member side of the Morris Federation. Two of its members, John Bacon and Chris Butler/Hall, have played an influential role respectively in the development of the policies of the Morris Federation and Open Morris, two organisations in the United Kingdom committed to the principle of mixed dancing.

The side has also welcomed dancers and musicians of all nationalities. Although most of its members have been English, it has also had Hong Kong Chinese, Scottish, American, Australian, New Zealand, French, South African, Thai, Ukrainian and Japanese members.

== Invention of traditions ==
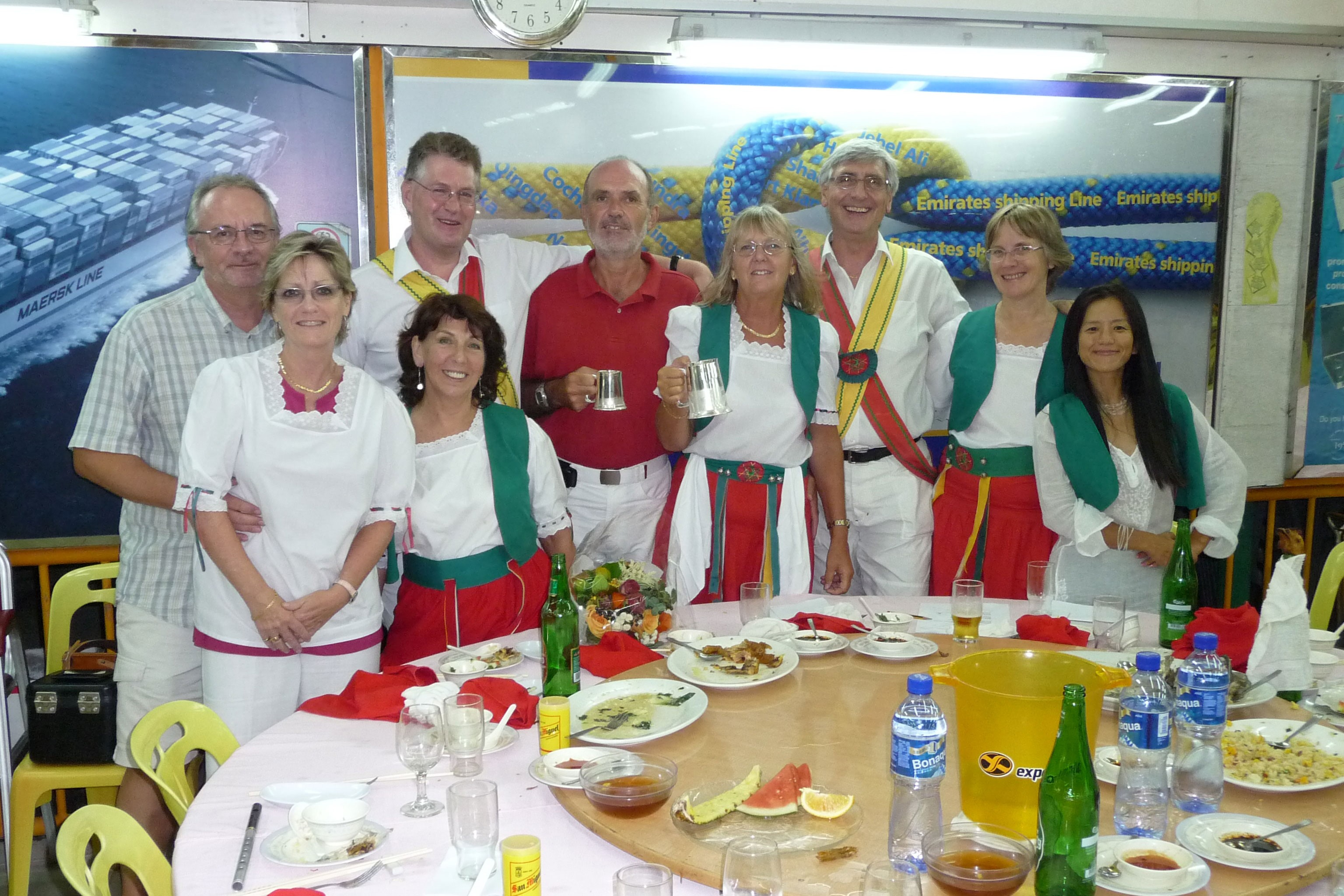
Farewell ale for Hong Kong Morris stalwarts Sue and Dave Ellis, 25 September 2009

A number of traditions were invented by the Hong Kong Morris in the early 1980s, some of which have survived. These include an adaptation of the Oxford custom May Morning, a ritual that includes dancing on The Peak at dawn followed by a hearty breakfast and still more dancing; Macau trips, including evenings of singing and dancing at the Pousada da Coloane hotel and lunch at Fernando's restaurant on Hac Sa Beach; junk trips to the Lamma Island Wan Kee Seafood Restaurant; Boxing Day dancing; and a send-off 'ale' for departing members of the side.

== Overseas tours ==
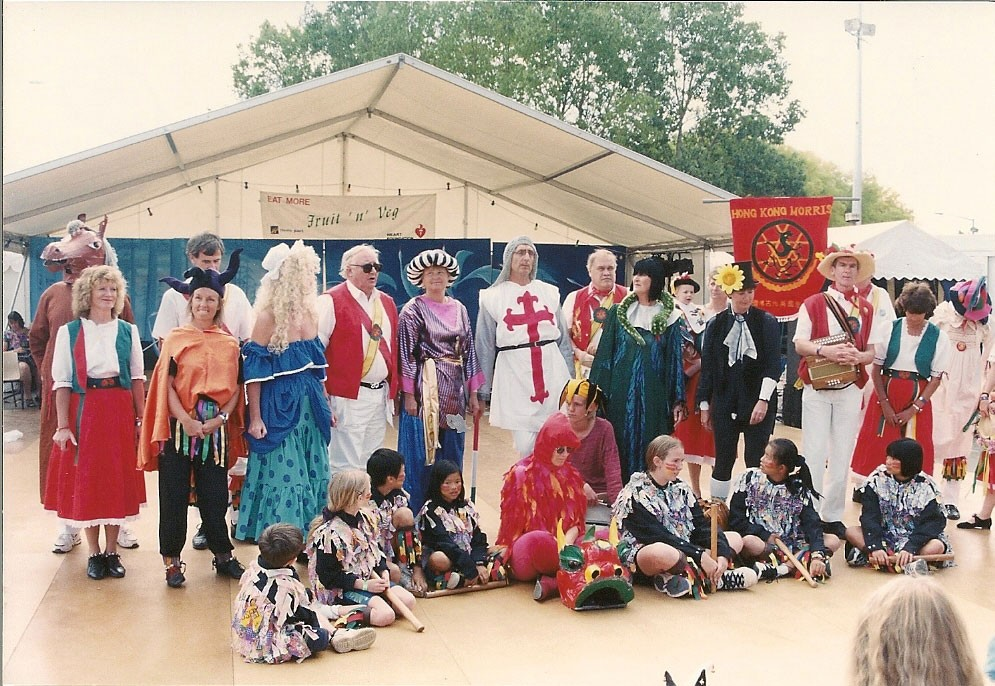
The Hong Kong Morris performs a traditional mumming play in Canberra, 1997

The first overseas tour by the Hong Kong Morris was to Manila in 1980. In 1984 a strong Hong Kong Morris side visited Perth (Australia) and danced with the local ladies' side The Fair Maids of Perth.

Subsequent tours have included the 1986 Guangzhou Tour, the 1987 North American Tour to Seattle, Victoria and Vancouver (a tour in which the side danced with the US sides MossyBacks and Misty City and the Canadian Victoria and Vancouver Morris sides); the 1988 Brisbane Tour to Maleny Folk Festival, at which the side's musician was asked to accompany an Australian women's side of practising witches; the 1989 Taiwan Tour, whose participants enjoyed the unfamiliar experience of being cultural ambassadors for British education; the 1990 Bangkok Tour; the 1995 Kuala Lumpur Tour, which doubled as a honeymoon for recently married Steve and Myra Ford; and the 1997 Canberra Tour, where the Hong Kong Morris provided a visual history of morris dancing as a specially-invited side, performed its mumming play and led a session of chorus singing.

== Visits to Hong Kong by overseas sides ==
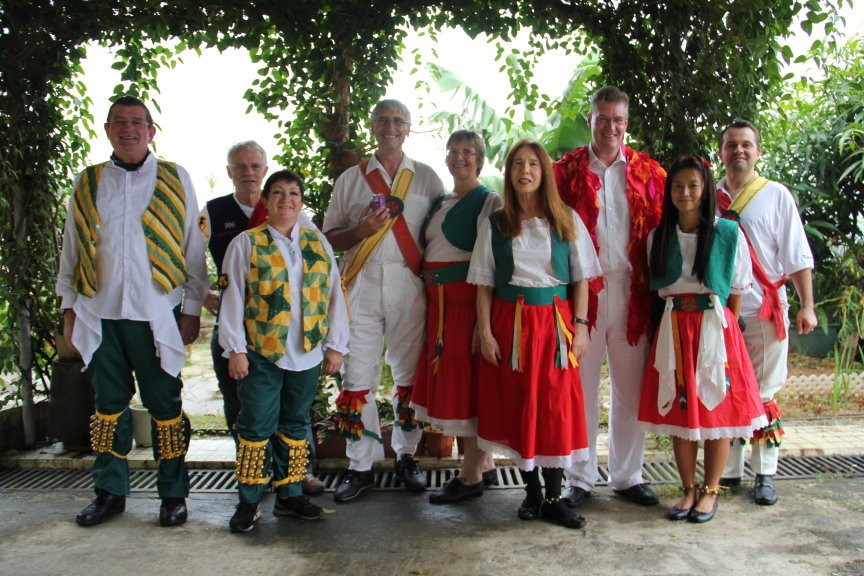
Hong Kong and Cyprus Morris at Tai Hang, 6 November 2010

The Hong Kong Morris is the only morris side in Hong Kong, and has therefore welcomed visits from other morris sides. Teams that have danced in Hong Kong as guests of the Hong Kong Morris include the Australian side The Fair Maids of Perth (1985, in return for the 1984 Perth Tour), the American sides MossyBack Morris Men and Misty City (1988, in return for the 1987 North American Tour), and the UK clog dancing side Kettle Bridge Clogs (1989).

Several former members of the Hong Kong Morris now dance with other sides, and occasionally revisit their old haunts. Peter and Christine Baldwin, now with the Cyprus Morris, danced with the Hong Kong Morris in November 2010 in the village of Tai Hang in the Lam Tsuen valley.
