= Morris dance =

English performance folk dance

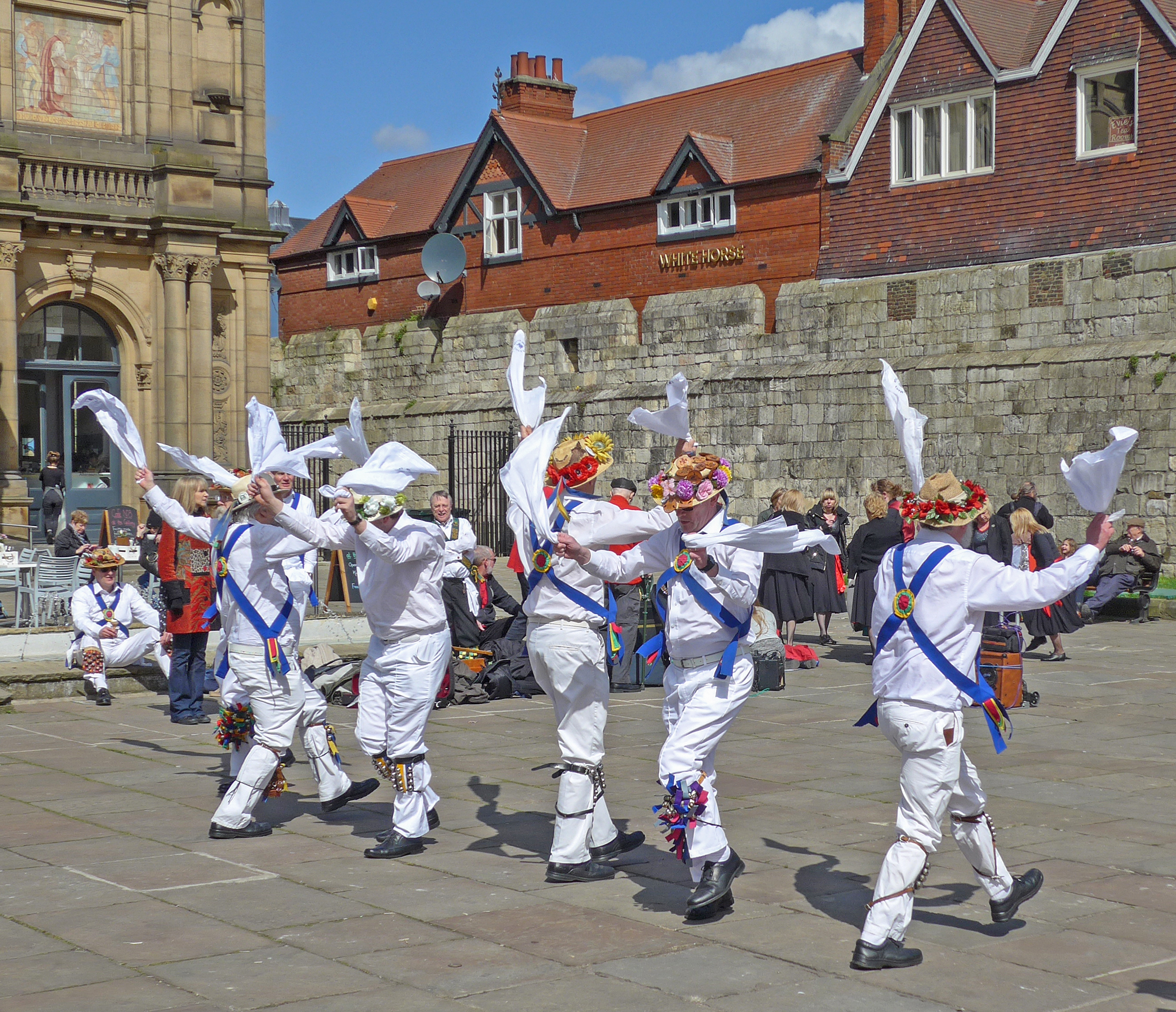
Morris dancers with handkerchiefs in York

Morris dancing is a form of English folk dance. It is based on rhythmic stepping and sequences of choreographed movement by a group of dancers in costume, usually wearing bell pads on their shins, their shoes or both. A band or single musician, also costumed, will accompany them. Sticks, swords, handkerchiefs, and a variety of other implements may be used as accessories by the dancers.

Morris dancing first appeared in England in the 15th century. Its earliest surviving mention dates to 1448 and records the payment of seven shillings to Morris dancers by the Goldsmiths' Company in London.

Three prominent groups organise and support Morris dancing in England: Morris Ring, Morris Federation and Open Morris; all three organisations have members from other countries as well.

There are around 150 Morris sides (or teams) in the United States. English immigrants form a large part of the Morris tradition in Australia, Canada, New Zealand and Hong Kong. There are relatively isolated groups in other countries, for example those in Utrecht and Helmond, Netherlands; the Arctic Morris Group of Helsinki, Finland and Stockholm, Sweden; as well as in Cyprus, St Petersburg, Russia, and in the Alsace-Basel region at the border of France and Switzerland.

== Name and origins ==
Morris dancing was imported from village festivities into popular entertainment after the invention of the court masque by Henry VIII. The word Morris apparently derived from morisco, meaning 'Moorish'. Cecil Sharp, whose collecting of Morris dances preserved many from extinction, suggested that it might have arisen from the dancers' blacking their faces as part of the necessary ritual disguise.

The name is first recorded in English in the mid-15th century as Morisk dance, moreys daunce, morisse daunce, i.e. 'Moorish dance'. The term entered English via Flemish mooriske danse. Comparable terms in other languages include German Moriskentanz (also from the 15th century), French morisques, Croatian moreška, and moresco, moresca or morisca in Italy and Spain. The modern spelling Morris-dance first appeared in the 17th century. In Edward Phillips's The New World of English Words, first published in 1658, the term morisco was referenced as both "a Moor" and "the Morris dance, as it were the Moorish dance", while John Bullokar defined it in 1695 as "a certain dance used among the Moors; whence our Morris dance".

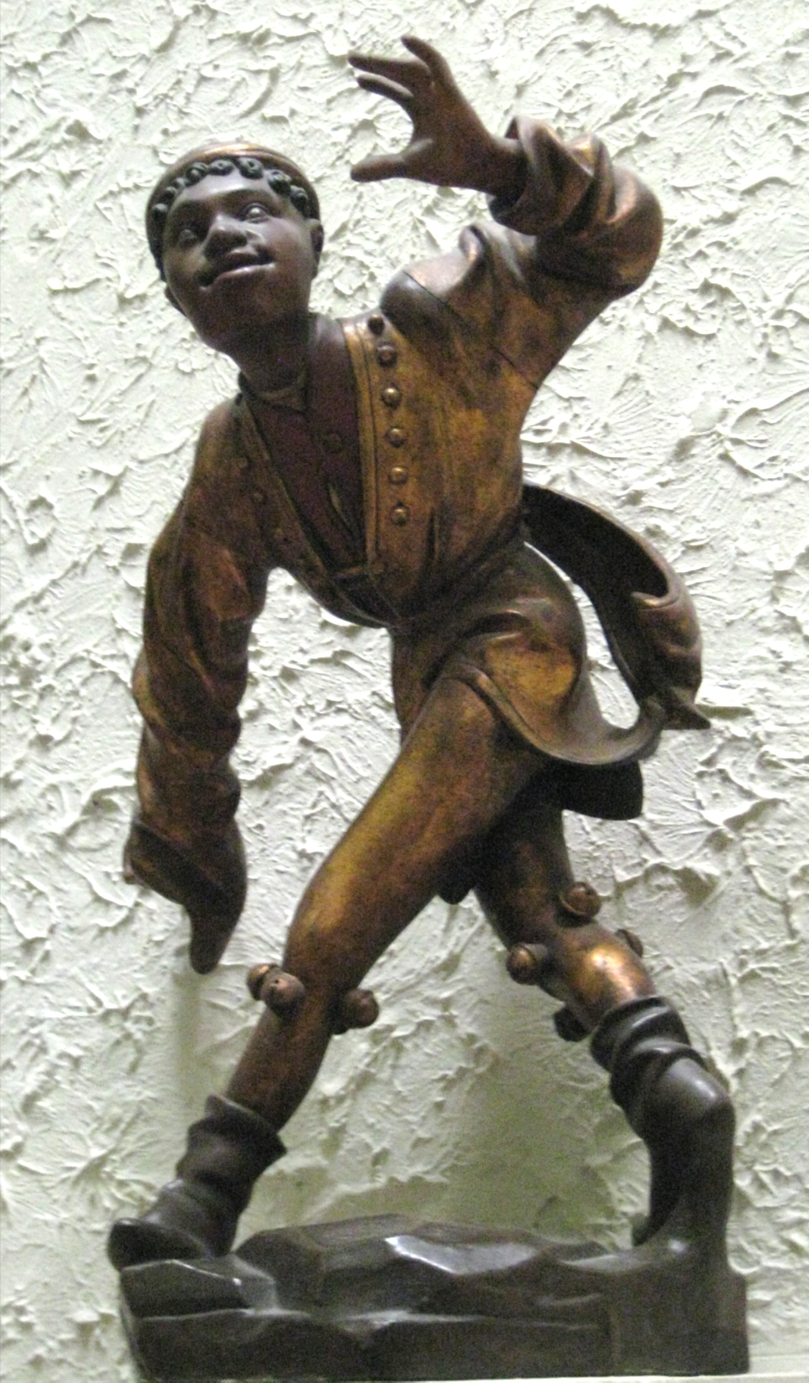
One of Erasmus Grasser's small Moriskentänzer statues from 1480, showing what would have been termed a "moorish" dancer, where seven of the other nine surviving carvings are fairer-skinned. All wear bells on their legs.

It is unclear how the dance came to be referred to as Moorish, "unless in reference to fantastic dancing or costumes", i.e. the deliberately "exotic" flavour of the performance. The English dance thus apparently arose as part of a wider 15th-century European fashion for supposedly "Moorish" spectacle, which also left traces in Spanish and Italian folk dance. The means and chronology of the transmission of this fashion is now difficult to trace; the London Chronicle recorded "spangled Spanish dancers" performed an energetic dance before King Henry VII at Christmas in 1494, but Heron's accounts also mention "pleying of the mourice dance" four days earlier, and the attestation of the English term from the mid-15th century establishes that there was a "Moorish dance" performed in England decades prior to 1494.

An alternative derivation from the Latin mōs, mōris (custom and usage) has also been suggested.

It has been suggested that the tradition of rural English dancers blackening their faces may be a form of disguise, or a reference either to the Moors or to miners; the origins of the practice remain unclear and are the subject of ongoing debate. In June 2020 the Joint Morris Organisation called for the use of black makeup to be discontinued, in response to the Black Lives Matter movement. Groups that used face paint changed to blue, green, or yellow and black stripes.

== History in England ==
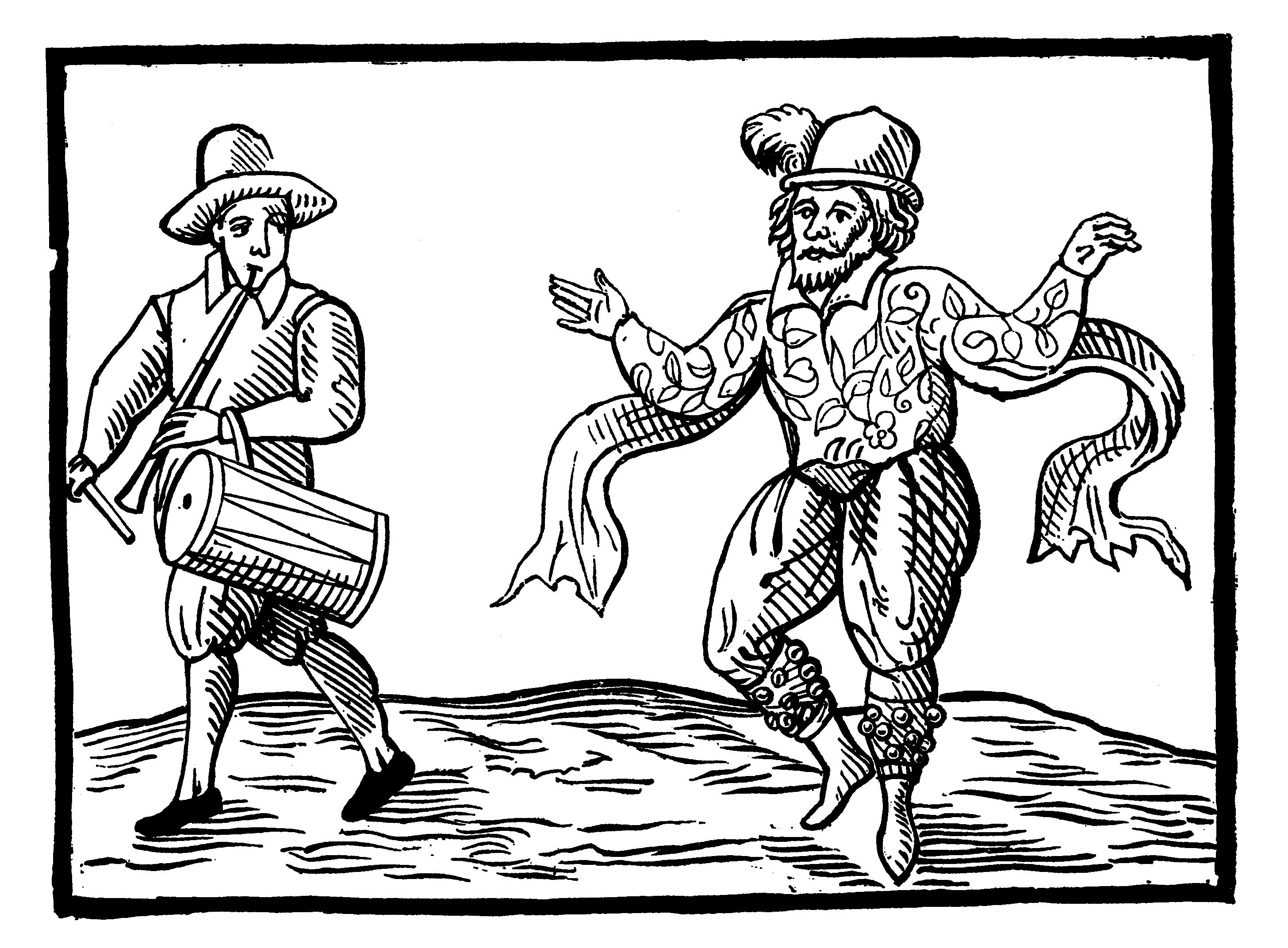
Illustration of William Kempe, Morris dancing from London to Norwich in 1600

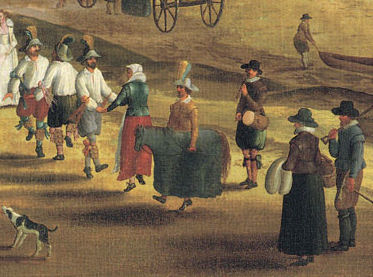
Morris dancers and a hobby horse: detail of Thames at Richmond, with the Old Royal Palace, c. 1620

The earliest (15th-century) references place the Morris dance in a courtly setting. The dance became part of performances for the lower classes by the later 16th century. Henry VIII owned a gold salt cellar which depicted a Morris dance with five dancers and a "tabrett". A "tabret" is a small tabor drum. On 4 January 1552, George Ferrers, the Lord of Misrule of Edward VI, put on a show in London which included "mores danse, dansyng with a tabret". In 1600, the Shakespearean actor William Kempe Morris danced from London to Norwich, an event chronicled in his Nine Daies Wonder (1600).

Almost nothing is known about the folk dances of England before the mid-17th century. While it is possible to speculate on the transition of "Morris dancing" from the courtly to a rural setting (it may have acquired elements of pre-Elizabethan (medieval) folk dance), such proposals will always be based on an argument from silence as there is no direct record of what such elements would have looked like. In the Elizabethan era, there was significant cultural contact between Italy and England, and it has been suggested that much of what is now considered traditional English folk dance, and especially English country dance, is descended from Italian dances imported in the 16th century.

By the mid-17th century, the working peasantry took part in Morris dances, especially at Whitsun. A pamphlet acquired by Horsham Museum, created by Thomas Munn, known as Tom the Smuggler, that was given to his gaoler on the morning of his execution in 1750, describes how he got a group of young fellows to go Morris dancing.

Morris dancing continued in popularity until the Industrial Revolution and its accompanying social changes. Four teams claim a continuous lineage of tradition within their village or town: Abingdon (their Morris team was kept going by the Hemmings family), Bampton, Headington Quarry, and Chipping Campden. Other villages have revived their own traditions, and hundreds of other teams across the globe have adopted (and adapted) these traditions, or have created their own styles from the basic building blocks of Morris stepping and figures.

By the late 19th century, and in the West Country at least, Morris dancing was fast becoming more a local memory than an activity. D'Arcy Ferris (or de Ferrars), a Cheltenham-based singer, music teacher and organiser of pageants, became intrigued by the tradition and sought to revive it. He first encountered Morris in Bidford and organised its revival. Over the following years he took the side to several places in the West Country, from Malvern to Bicester and from Redditch to Moreton in Marsh. By 1910, he and Cecil Sharp were in correspondence on the subject.

Several English folklorists were responsible for recording and reviving the tradition in the early 20th century, often from a bare handful of surviving members of mid-19th-century village sides. Among these, the most notable are Cecil Sharp and Mary Neal.

=== Revival ===
Boxing Day 1899 is widely regarded as the starting point for the Morris revival. Cecil Sharp was visiting a friend's house in Headington, near Oxford, when the Headington Quarry Morris side arrived to perform. Sharp was intrigued by the music and collected several tunes from the side's musician, William Kimber, including "Country Gardens". A decade later he began collecting the dances, spurred and at first assisted by Mary Neal, a founder of the Espérance Club (a dressmaking co-operative and club for young working women in London), and Herbert MacIlwaine, musical director of the Espérance Club. Neal was looking for dances for her girls to perform, and so the first revival performance was by young women in London.

=== Organisations ===
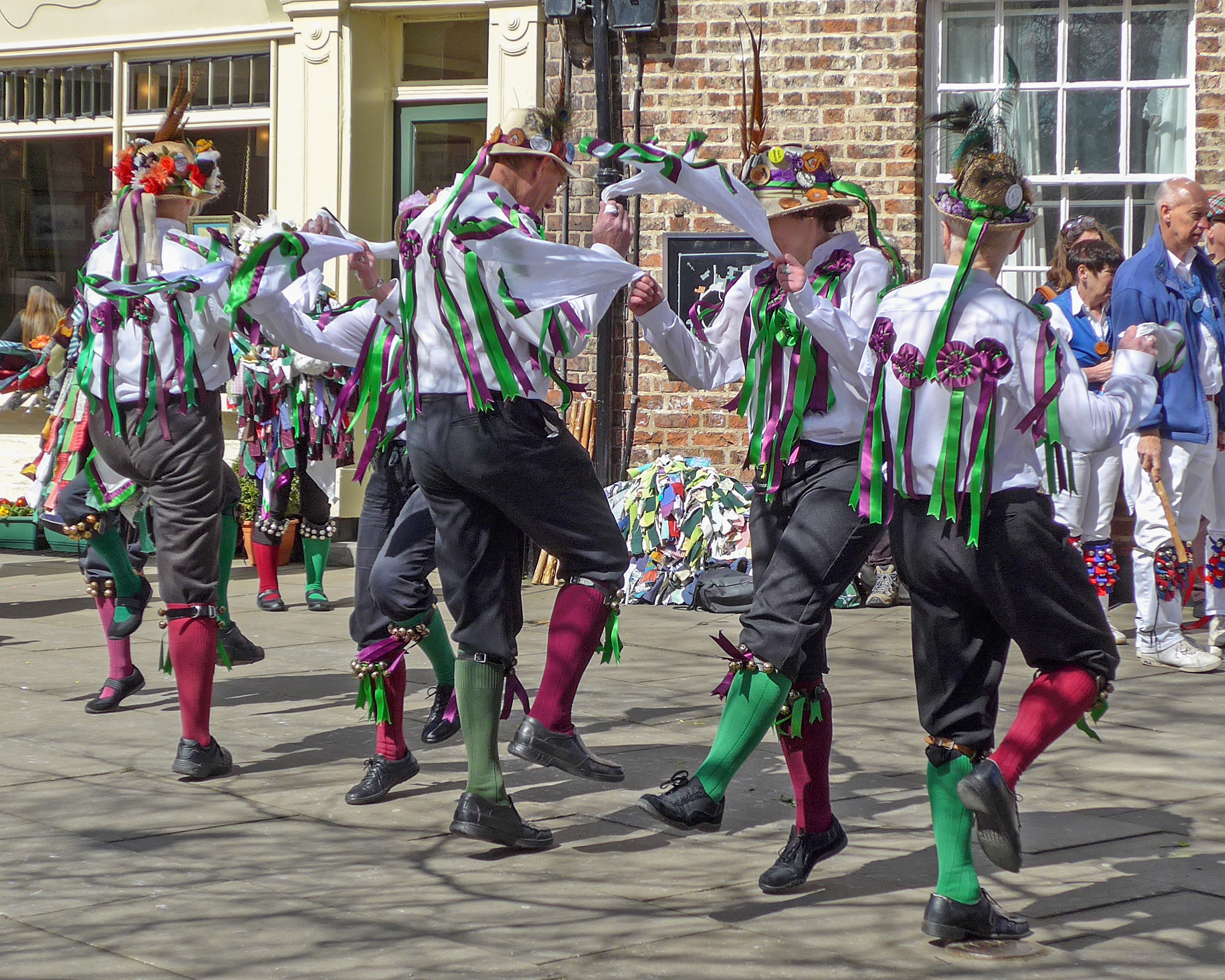
Mucky Mountains Morris from St Helens dancing at the Joint Morris Organisation Day of Dance in York in 2016

In the first few decades of the 20th century, several men's sides were formed, and in 1934 the Morris Ring was founded by six revival sides:

- Cambridge Morris Men
- Letchworth Morris
- Thaxted Morris Men
- East Surrey Morris Men
- Greensleeves Morris Men (based in Wimbledon)
- Oxford Morris (which was not at the initial ring meeting at Thaxted but was influential in the creation of the Ring's constitution).

In the 1950s and especially the 1960s, there was an explosion of new dance teams, some of them women's or mixed sides. At the time, there was often heated debate over the propriety and even legitimacy of women dancing the Morris, even though there is evidence as far back as the 16th century that there were female Morris dancers. There are now male, female and mixed sides to be found.

Partly because women's and mixed sides were not eligible for full membership of the Morris Ring (this has now changed), two other national (and international) bodies were formed, the Morris Federation and Open Morris. All three bodies provide communication, advice, insurance, instructionals (teaching sessions) and social and dancing opportunities to their members. The three bodies co-operate on some issues, while maintaining their distinct identities. An umbrella body that includes all three, the Joint Morris Organisation, organises joint events and discusses issues that affect all members, such as access to both public liability and personal insurance cover.

== Morris dancing in Wales ==
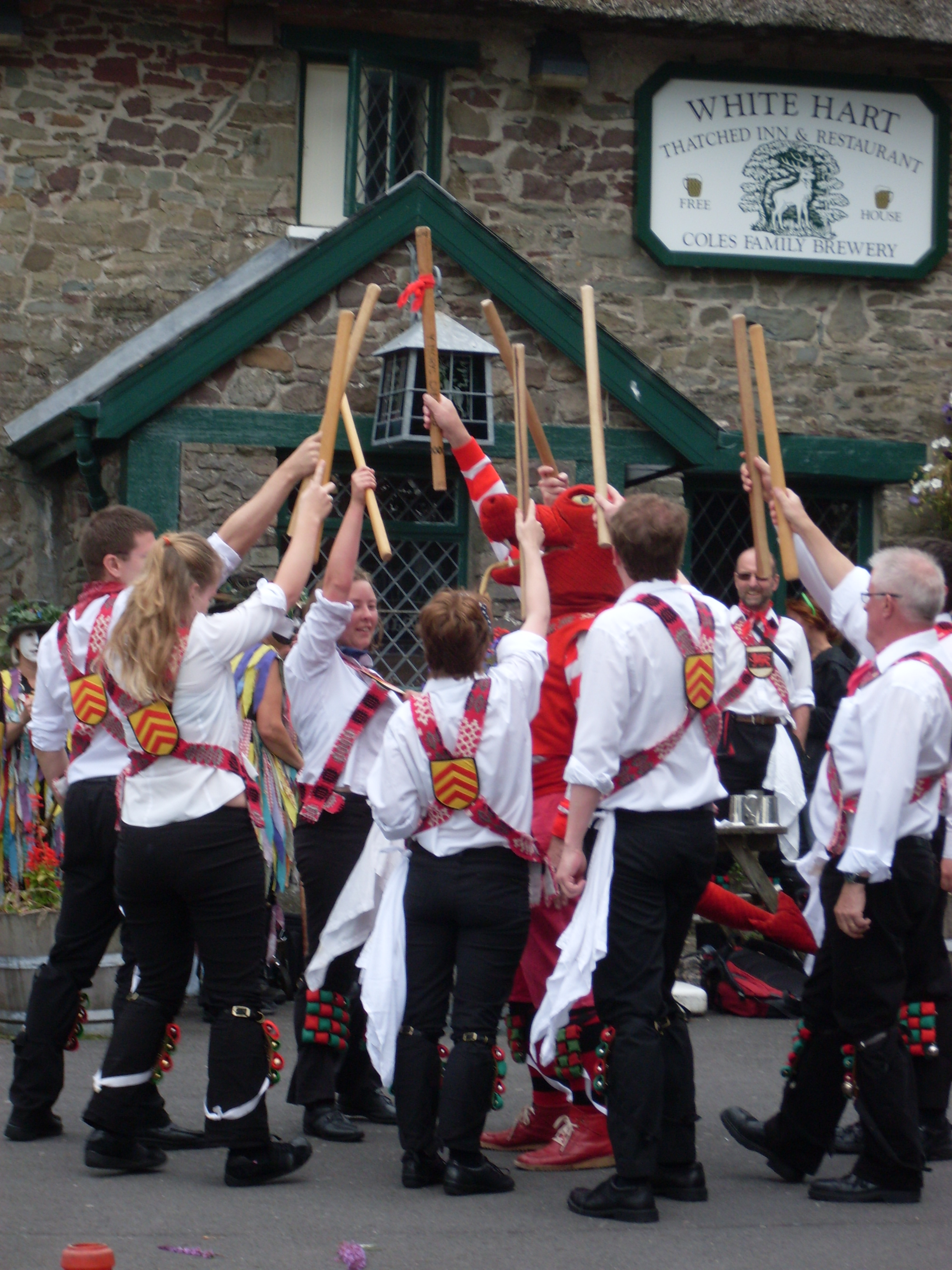
Cardiff Morris in Carmarthen finish a Nantgarw stick dance in distinctive style, by surrounding the mascot, Idris.

Traditional Welsh dance experienced a revival in the early 20th century, and while these dances were commonly performed as progressive longways display dances, Lois Blake noted that the Llanover Dances displayed "the influence of the Morris, both in form and movements".

While these traditions that had been recorded by Ceinwen Thomas and Catherine Margretta Thomas were not specifically Morris dances as recognised today, they were interpreted in new ways by Morris men. While one dance, Y Gaseg Eira would become a central part of the Welsh morris.

The revival saw the reinvention of a living tradition in Wales, with new dances such as Y Derwydd, Hela'r Sgwarnog, Ty Coch Caerdydd and Y Goron becoming recognised to be just as much a part of the Nantgarw tradition as the original dance.

== Morris dancing in the United States ==
Morris dancing has been practised in the United States since at least 1908, although an article published by the Country Dance and Song Society points to 1910 as the year Morris dancing truly took off in America. The primary organization supporting Morris Dance in the US is the North American Morris Dance Organization, which is affiliated with the Country Dance and Song Society as well as the Morris Ring, Morris Federation, and Open Morris. British-American musician and folklorist Tony Barrand was key in developing and documenting Morris history in the US, including founding the Marlboro Morris Men as well as the Marlboro Morris Ale.

Most Morris sides in the United States are concentrated on the East Coast, particularly in the Boston-Washington corridor. Large regular events in this part of the country include the Marlboro Morris Ale and Dancing America Rapper Tournament (the American offshoot of Dancing England Rapper Tournament). Minneapolis is the hub for Morris dancing in the Midwest, with six teams in the Minneapolis-St. Paul metro area and nine teams in the whole of Minnesota. Dancing the sun up on May Day is an important activity for many American Morris dance teams.

== Styles ==
Today, there are six predominant styles of Morris dancing, and different dances or traditions within each style named after their region of origin.

- Cotswold Morris: dances from an area mostly in Gloucestershire and Oxfordshire; an established misnomer, since the Cotswolds overlap this region only partially. Normally danced with handkerchiefs or sticks to accompany the hand movements. Dances are usually for 6 or 8 dancers, but solo and duo dances (known as single or double jigs) also occur.
- North West Morris: more military in style and often processional, that developed out of the mills in the North-West of England in the 19th and early 20th centuries.
- Border Morris from the English-Welsh border: a simpler, looser, more vigorous style, occasionally danced with coloured faces.
- Long Sword dance from Yorkshire and southern County Durham, danced with long, rigid metal or wooden swords for, usually, six or eight dancers.
- Rapper sword from the Northumberland and Durham Coalfield, danced with short flexible sprung steel swords, usually for five dancers.
- Molly dance from Cambridgeshire. Traditionally danced on Plough Monday, they were feast dances that were danced to collect money during harsh winters. One of the dancers would be dressed as a woman, hence the name. Joseph Needham identified two separate families of Molly dances, one from three villages in the Cambridge area and one from two in the Ely area.

=== Cotswold ===
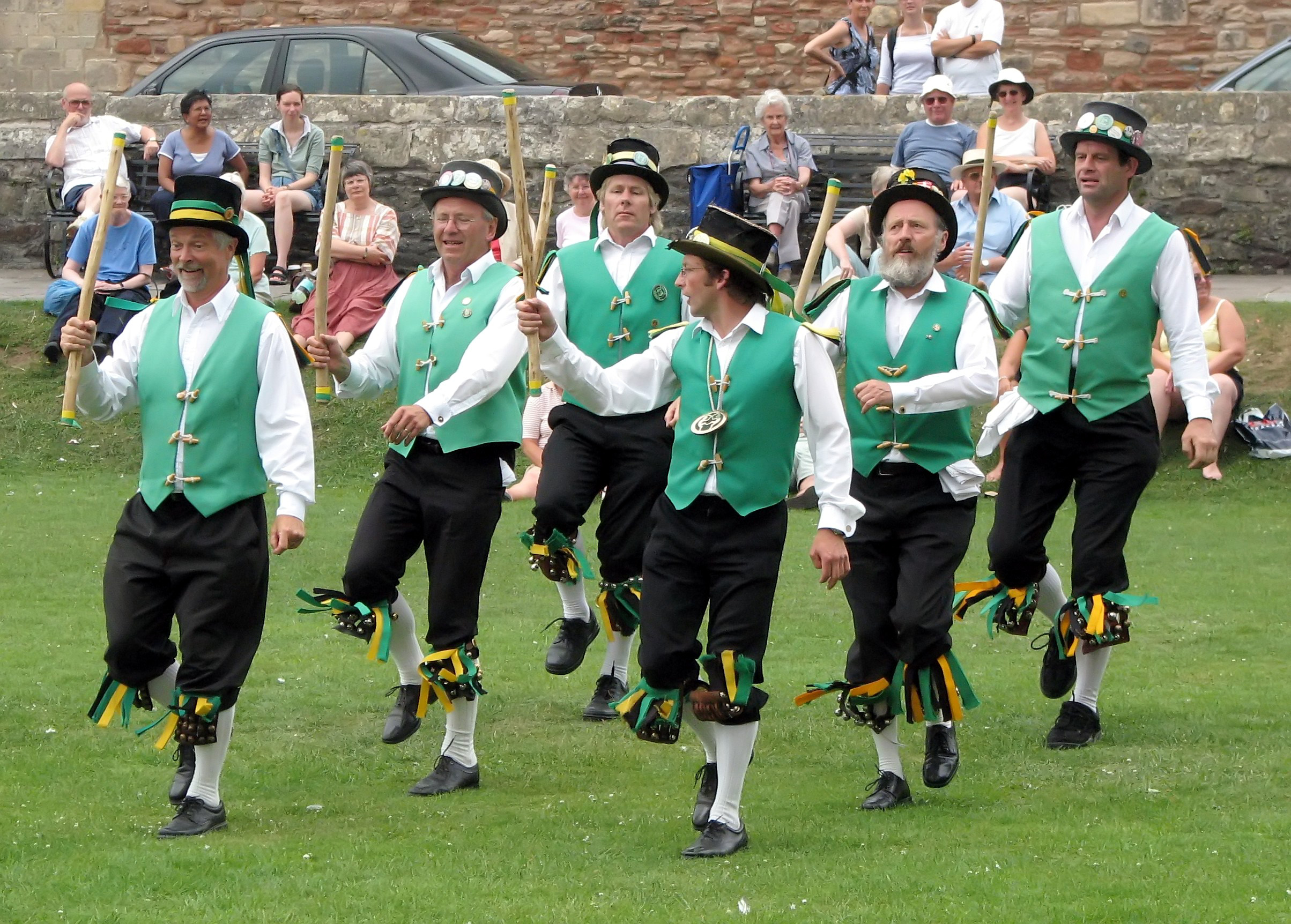
Cotswold-style Morris dancing in the grounds of Wells Cathedral, Wells, England – Exeter Morris Men

Lionel Bacon records Cotswold Morris traditions from these towns and villages: Abingdon, Adderbury, Ascot-under-Wychwood, Badby, Bampton, Bidford, Bledington, Brackley, Bucknell, Chipping Campden, Ducklington, Eynsham, Headington Quarry, Hinton-in-the-Hedges, Ilmington, Kirtlington, Leafield (Field Town), Longborough, Oddington, Sherbourne, Stanton Harcourt, Upton-upon-Severn and Wheatley.

Bacon also lists the tradition from Lichfield, which is Cotswold-like despite that city's distance from the Cotswold Morris area; the authenticity of this tradition has been questioned. In 2006, a small number of dances from a previously unknown tradition was discovered by Barry Care, MBE, keeper of The Morris Ring Photographic Archive, and a founding member of Moulton Morris Men (Ravensthorpe, Northamptonshire)—two of them danceable.

Other dances listed by Bacon include Border Morris dances from Brimfield, Bromsberrow Heath, Evesham, Leominster, Much Wenlock, Pershore, Upton-upon-Severn, Upton Snodsbury, White Ladies Aston, and miscellaneous non-Cotswold, non-Border dances from Steeple Claydon and Winster. There are a number of traditions which have been collected since the mid-20th century, though few have been widely adopted. Examples are Broadwood, Duns Tew, and Ousington-under-Wash in the Cotswold style, and Upper and Lower Penn in the Border style.

=== North West ===
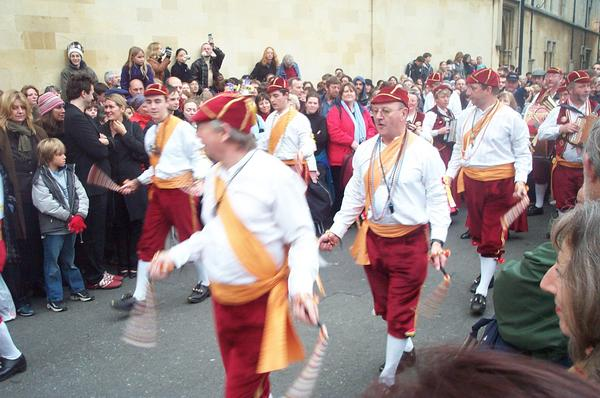
Horwich Prize Medal Morris Men, a North West Morris side based near Bolton

The North West tradition is named after the North West region of England and has always featured mixed and female sides, at least as far back as the 18th century. There is a picture of Eccles Wakes painted in 1822 that shows both male and female dancers.

Historically, most sides danced in various styles of shoes or boots, although dancing in clogs was also very common. Modern revivalist sides have tended more towards the wearing of clogs. The dances were often associated with rushcarts at the local wakes or holidays, and many teams rehearsed only for these occasions. While some teams continue to rehearse and dance for a single local festival or event (such as the Abram Morris Dancers), the majority of teams now rehearse throughout the year, with the majority of performances occurring in the spring and summer. The dances themselves were often called 'maze' or 'garland dances' as they involved a very intricate set of movements in which the dancers wove in and out of each other. Some dances were performed with a wicker hoop (decorated with garlands of flowers) held above the dancer's head. Some dancers were also associated with a tradition of mumming and hold a pace egging play in their area.

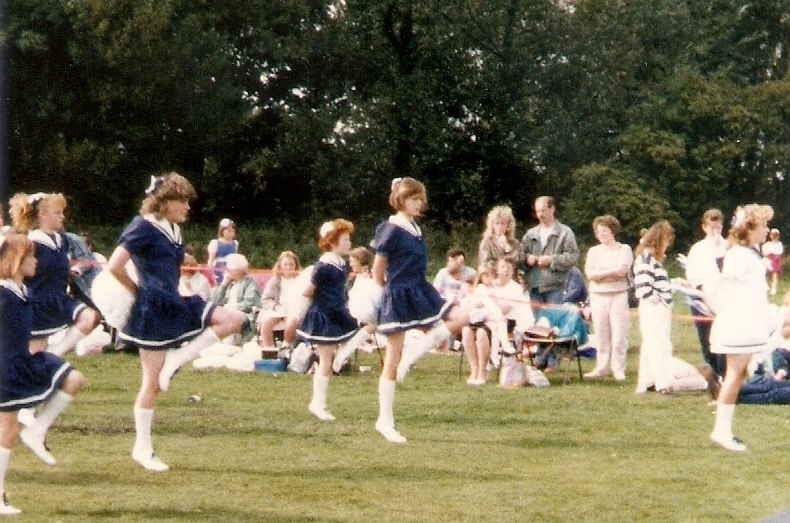
North West Carnival Morris troupe dancing in Skipton, Yorkshire in 1987

The Britannia Coconut Dancers, named after a mill not far from Bacup, are unique in the tradition, in that they used sawn bobbins to make a noise, and perform to the accompaniment of a brass ensemble. They are one of the few North West Morris groups that still black their faces. It is said that the dance found its way to the area through Cornishmen who migrated to work in the Rossendale quarries.

Carnival morris dancing shares a parallel history with North West morris dancing but began to evolve independently from around the 1940s onwards. It remains extremely popular with over 8,000 current dancers.

Girls' carnival morris dancing is highly competitive and characterised by precise, synchronous routines with pom-poms (or 'shakers') executed to pop music. It is performed almost exclusively by girls and women in Lancashire, Cheshire and parts of North Wales. Performances typically take place in sports halls and community centres and participants more closely align with British carnival performances such as jazz kazoo marching bands, entertainer troupes and majorettes, than with the morris performances of the folk revival.

In 2005, playwright Helen Blakeman staged 'The Morris' at the Liverpool Everyman, inspired by her childhood experience as a carnival morris dancer. In 2017, an exhibition of photographs taken at a carnival morris dancing competition in Southport by artist, Lucy Wright was presented at Cecil Sharp House.

=== Border ===
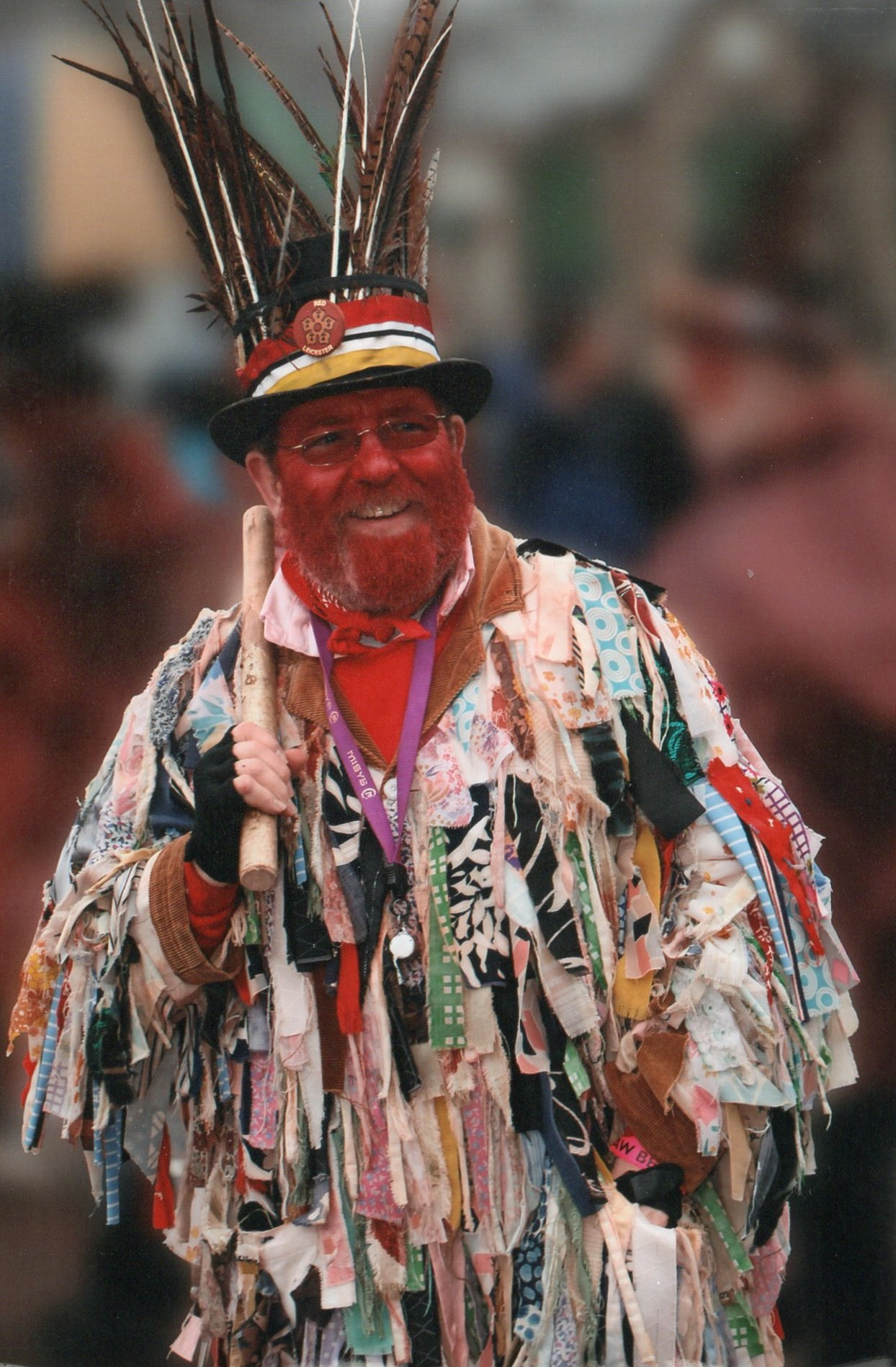
A Morris dancer with coloured disguise which was often used by dancers from the borders of Wales and England.

The term "Border Morris" was first used by E. C. Cawte in a 1963 article on the Morris dance traditions of Herefordshire, Shropshire and Worcestershire: counties along the border with Wales. Characteristics of the tradition as practised in the 19th and early 20th centuries include: blackface or coloured facepaint (in some areas), use of either a small strip of bells (in some areas) or no bells at all (in others), costume often consisting of ordinary clothes decorated with ribbons, strips of cloth, or pieces of coloured paper (known as 'raggies'); or sometimes "fancy dress", small numbers of traditional dances in the team repertoire, often only one and rarely more than two, highly variable number of dancers in the set and configurations of the set (some sides had different versions of a dance for different numbers of dancers), and an emphasis on stick dances almost to the exclusion of hankie dances.

=== Sword dancing ===
Usually regarded as a type of Morris, although many of the performers themselves consider it as a traditional dance form in its own right, is the sword dance tradition, which includes both rapper sword and longsword traditions. In both styles the "swords" are not actual swords, but implements specifically made for the dance. The dancers are usually linked one to another via the swords, with one end of each held by one dancer and the other end by another. Rapper sides consist of five dancers, who are permanently linked-up during the dance. The rapper sword is a very flexible strip of spring-steel with a wooden handle at each end. The longsword is about 2 ft 6 in (0.76 m) long, with a wooden handle at one end, a blunt tip, and no edge. Sometimes ribbons are threaded through a hole in the tip of the sword, and the dancers grab on to them during the course of the dance. Longsword sides consist usually of five to eight dancers. In both rapper and longsword there is often a supernumerary "character", who dances around, outside, and inside the set.

=== Other traditions ===
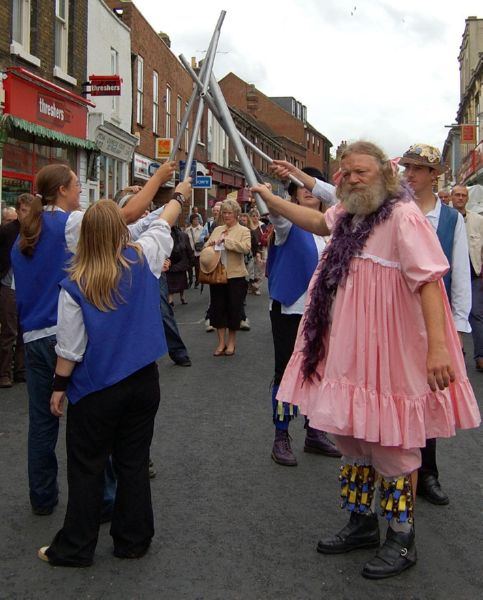
Plough Monday dance by the Royal Liberty Morris

The English mummers play occasionally involves Morris or sword dances either incorporated as part of the play or performed at the same event. Mummers plays are often performed in the streets near Christmas to celebrate the New Year and the coming springtime. In these plays are central themes of death and rebirth.

Other forms include Molly dance from Cambridgeshire. Molly dance, which is associated with Plough Monday, is a parodic form danced in work boots and with at least one Molly man dressed as a woman. The largest Molly Dance event is the Whittlesea Straw Bear Festival, established in 1980, held at Whittlesey in Cambridgeshire in January.

There is also Stave dancing from the south-west and the Abbots Bromley Horn Dance.

Additionally, there is a specifically Welsh version of the dance that is distinct from the Borders Morris style. This style is called the Nantgarw tradition after a small village in the Taff Valley. One Nantgarw dance, Y Caseg Eira, is derived directly from notes made on traditional Welsh dances from the 1890s. These notes were made by Ceinwen Thomas in the 1950s from the childhood recollections of her mother, Catherine Margretta Thomas. Others are more modern inventions made in the style of older dances. Dances in the Nantgarw style include; Caseg Eira (The Snow Mare), Hela'r Sgwarnog (Hunting The Hare) and Ty Coch Caerdydd (The Red House of Cardiff).

Jack-in-the-Green, a May Day figure consisting of a person enclosed in a framework covered with foliage, is frequently associated with Morris dancing, although he is not a typical member of a Morris side. The character became established in the 18th-century May Day processions of chimney sweeps and was later revived in several English towns, often with the involvement of Morris dancers. At celebrations such as those in Hastings and Rochester, someone playing the character Jack forms the centre of a procession accompanied by Morris sides, musicians and other traditional characters.

== Music ==
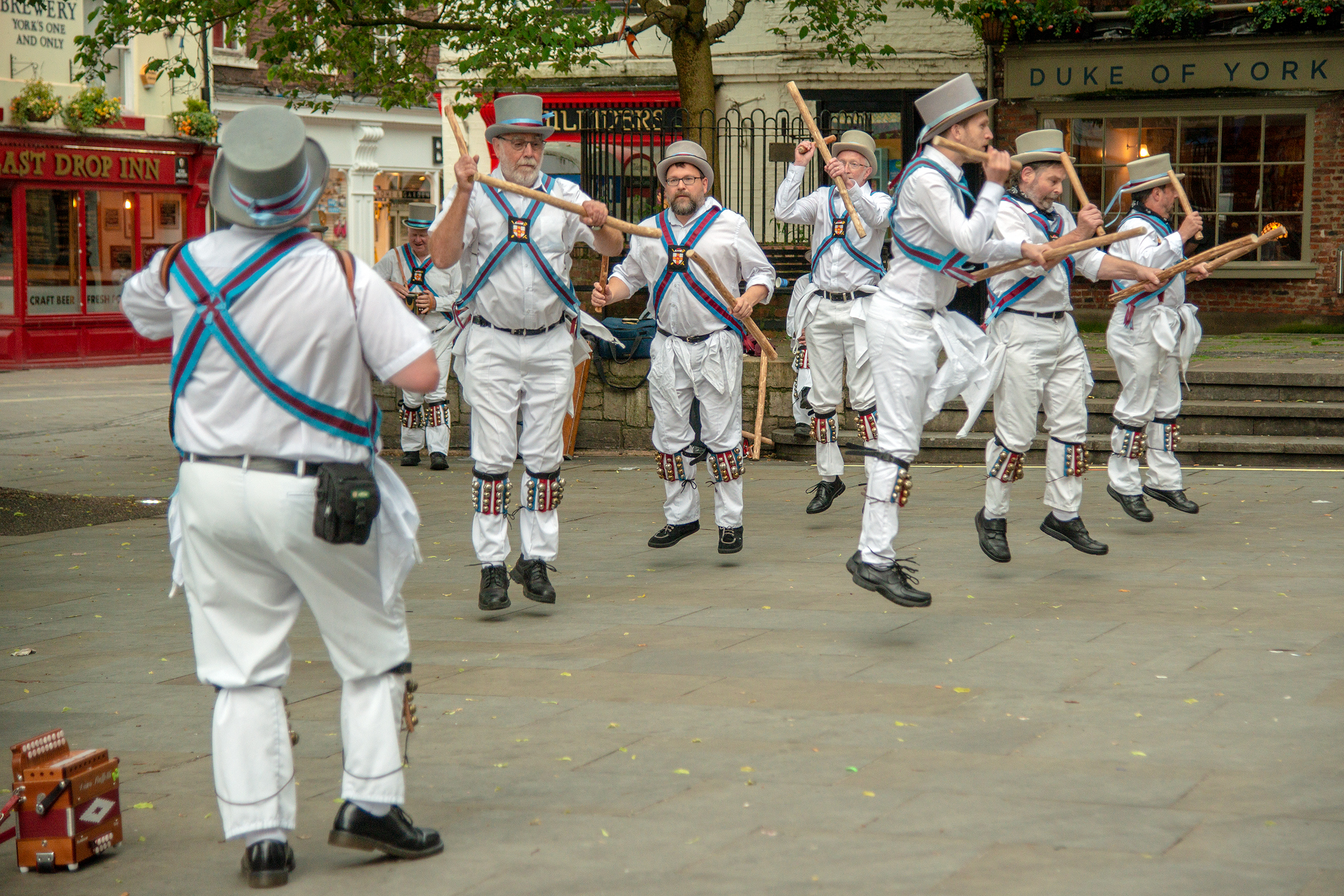
Ebor Morris dancing to accordion music, York (June 2018)

Music was traditionally provided by either a pipe and tabor or a fiddle. These are still used today, but the most common instrument is the melodeon. Accordions and concertinas are also common, and other instruments are sometimes used. Often drums are employed.

Cotswold and sword dancers are most often accompanied by a single player, but Northwest and Border sides often have a band, usually including a drum.

For Cotswold and (to a degree) Border dances, the tunes are traditional and specific: the name of the dance is often actually the name of the tune, and dances of the same name from different traditions will have slightly different tunes. For Northwest and sword dancing there is less often a specific tune for a dance: the players may use several tunes, and will often change tunes during a dance.

For dances which have set tunes, there is often a short song set to the tune. This is sung by the musician(s) or by the whole side as an introduction to the tune before the dance. The songs are usually rural in focus (i.e. related to agricultural practices or village life) and often bawdy or vulgar. Songs for some dances vary from side to side, and some sides omit songs altogether.

Several notable albums have been released, in particular the Morris On series, which consists of Morris On, Son of Morris On, Grandson of Morris On, Great Grandson of Morris On, Morris on the Road, and Mother of all Morris.

== Terminology ==
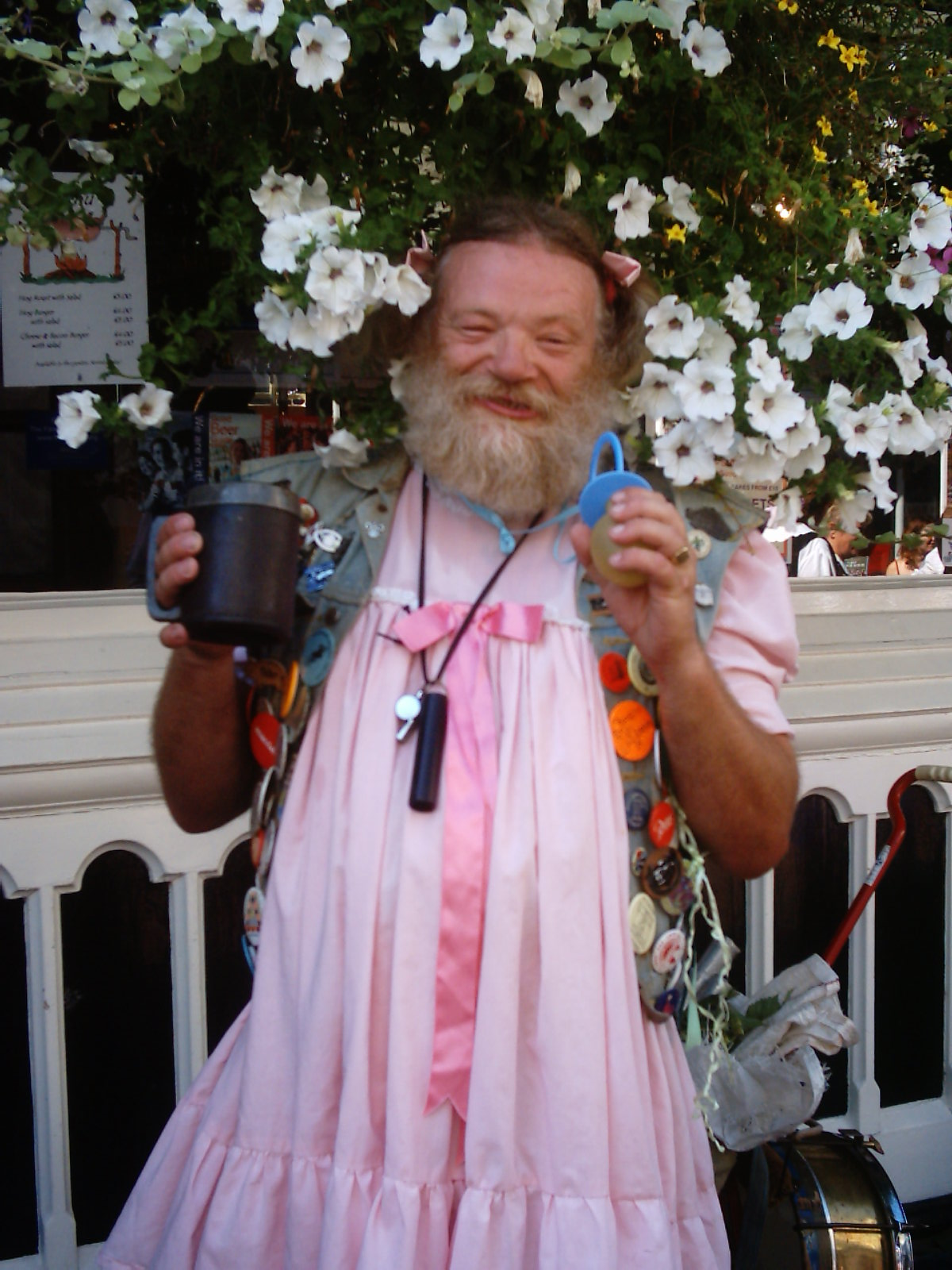
Pete the Royal Liberty Morris fool

Like many activities, Morris dancing has a range of words and phrases that it uses in special ways.

Many participants refer to the world of Morris dancing as a whole as "the Morris".

A Morris troupe is usually referred to as a side or a team. The two terms are interchangeable. Despite the terminology, Morris dancing is hardly ever competitive.

A set (which can also be referred to as a side) is a number of dancers in a particular arrangement for a dance. Most Cotswold Morris dances are danced in a rectangular set of six dancers, and most Northwest dances in a rectangular set of eight; but there are many exceptions.

A jig is a dance performed by one (or sometimes two) dancers, rather than by a set. Its music does not usually have the rhythm implied by the word "jig" in other contexts.

The titles of officers vary from side to side, but most sides have at least the following:

- The role of the squire varies. In some sides the squire is the leader, who speaks for the side in public, usually leads or calls the dances, and often decides the programme for a performance. In other sides the squire is more an administrator, with the foreman taking the lead, and the dances called by any experienced dancer.
- The foreman teaches and trains the dancers, and is responsible for the style and standard of the side's dancing. The foreman is often "active" with the "passive" dancers.
- The bagman is traditionally the keeper of the bag—that is to say, the side's funds and equipment. In some sides today, the bagman acts as secretary (particularly bookings secretary) and there is often a separate treasurer.
- On some sides a ragman manages and co-ordinates the team's kit or costume. This may include making bell-pads, ribbon bads, sashes and other accoutrements.

Many sides have one or more fools. A fool is usually extravagantly dressed, and communicates directly with the audience in speech or mime. The fool often dances around and even through a dance without appearing really to be a part of it, but it takes a talented dancer to pull off such fooling while actually adding to and not distracting from the main dance set.

Many sides also have a beast: a dancer in a costume made to look like a real or mythical animal. Beasts mainly interact with the audience, particularly children. In some groups this dancer is called the hobby.

A tradition in Cotswold Morris is a collection of dances that come from a particular area, and have something in common: usually the steps, arm movements, and dance figures. Many newer traditions are invented by revival teams.

In England, an ale is a private party where a number of Morris sides get together and perform dances for their own enjoyment rather than for an audience. Food is usually supplied, and sometimes this is a formal meal known as a feast or ale-feast. Occasionally, an evening ale is combined with a day or weekend of dance, where all the invited sides tour the area and perform in public. In North America the term is widely used to describe a full weekend of dancing involving public performances and sometimes workshops. In the 16th to 19th centuries, the term "ale" referred to a church- or dale-sponsored event where ale or beer was sold to raise funds. Morris dancers were often employed at such events.

== Evolution ==
=== Continuance of Morris tradition ===
The continuance of Morris dancing depends on enthusiasts and nationwide groupings such as The Morris Ring or The Morris Federation. Some believe that the music and dance recorded in the 19th century should be maintained, whilst others reinterpret the music and dance to suit their abilities and include modern influences. In 2008 a front-page article in the Independent Magazine noted the rising influence of neopaganism within the modern Morris tradition. The article featured the views of Neopagan sides Wolf's Head, Vixen Morris and Hunter's Moon Morris and contrasted them with those of the more traditional Long Man Morris Men. The Morris may have become popular in neopaganism thanks to the scholarship of James Frazer, who hypothesised that rural folk traditions were survivals of ancient pagan rituals. Though this view was fiercely criticised even by Frazer's contemporaries, it was fully embraced by Sir Edmund Chambers, one of the first to produce serious writing on English folk plays and dances, and who became a major influence on popular understanding of Morris dancing in the 20th century.

=== Age and gender issues ===
Belles of London City performing in Lyme Regis

In January 2009 The Telegraph published a report predicting the demise of Morris dancing within 20 years, due to the lack of young people willing to take part. This widespread story originated from a senior member of the more traditionally minded Morris Ring, and may only reflect the situation in relation to member groups of that organisation.

A survey published in December 2020 showed how the profile of morris dancers had evolved since the first survey published in 2014. The number of morris dancers in the UK had increased from 12,800 in 2014 to 13,600 in 2020. The average age of a morris dancer in the UK was 55, up from 52 in 2014. The survey also reported an even balance between male and female performers by 2020.

=== Use of the Internet ===
The advent of the Internet in the 1990s has given Morris sides a new platform upon which to perform. Many Morris sides now have websites which seek to reflect the public persona of the individual sides as much as record their exploits and list forthcoming performances.

There are a multitude of Morris-related blogs and forums, and individual sides are to be found maintaining an interactive presence on social networking sites. Surveys in 2021 of use of social media services by Morris sides found that the Westminster Morris Men YouTube channel had received over 100,00 views and the Shrewsbury Morris's Twitter account had over 100,000 followers.

=== In popular culture ===
The success of Terry Pratchett's Discworld novels has seen the entirely invented Dark Morris tradition being brought to life in some form by genuine Morris sides such as the Witchmen Morris and Jack Frost Morris. Dark Morris has been described as having been "evolved from the border revival of the 1970s which was part of a wider neo-traditionalist surge of interest in regional morris styles".

The narrator of Robert Plunket's novel My Search for Warren Harding humorously describes his love of Morris dancing and how out of place he feels practising in America.

== Kit and clothing ==
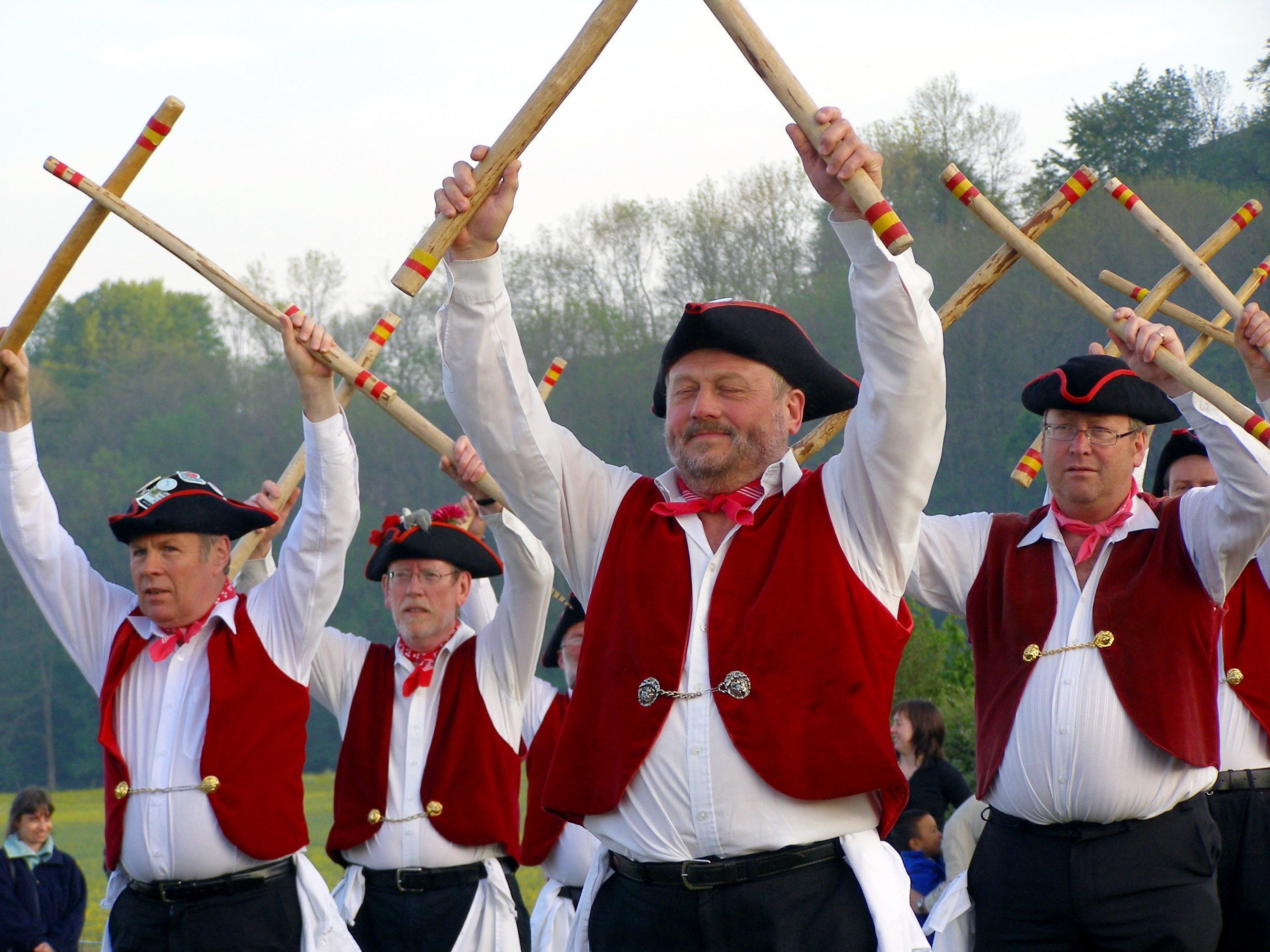
Victory Morrismen from Portsmouth dancing in Hampshire

There is great variety shown in how Morris sides dress, from the predominantly white clothing of Cotswold sides to the tattered jackets worn by Border teams. Common items of clothing include bell pads, baldrics, braces, rosettes, sashes, waistcoats, tatter-coats (or raggies), knee-length breeches, wooden clogs, hats (straw hats, top hats, or bowlers), neckerchiefs, and armbands.

== Namesakes ==
- The dance may have inspired the names of the board games three men's morris, six men's morris and nine men's morris.
- Erasmus Grasser, a German sculptor, created 16 realistic animated wooden figures in the late 15th century called the Morris dancers.
- Two ships named Morris Dance served in the Royal Navy in the 20th century.

== See also ==
- Ball de bastons
- Blackface and Morris dancing – Cultural dispute involving the English folk dance
- Călușari – Participants in a traditional Romanian dance
- Maculelê (dance) – Brazilian folk dance
- Matachines – Ritual dancers
- Moreška – Croatian traditional dance re-enactment of a war
- Morris: A Life with Bells On – 2009 film by Lucy Akhurst
- Saint George's Day in England – History of the feast day of in England
- Way of the Morris – 2011 documentary film by Tim Plester and Rob Curry
- Weapon dance – Form of dance using weapons
