= Open Morris =

Morris dancing association, UK

Open Morris is one of the three umbrella groups for morris dance sides in the United Kingdom. It was formed primarily by members of Fenstanton Morris (an early mixed sex dance side operating near Huntingdon) and other dancers located in East Anglia in the 1979 as a response to the male-only policy of the Morris Ring and the female-only policy of the Women's Morris Federation - although, in September 1980, the Morris Federation dropped their female-only policy in favour of one that allowed both joint sides, where morris sides had male and female members who would dance in all male or all female sets, and mixed sets, where men and women would dance together. Open Morris was a response to this as the small number of mixed sides in the 1980s wished to form their own umbrella organisation.

Today Open Morris has a large number of member sides and interacts happily with the other umbrella groups as a member of the Joint Morris Organisation. Members of this grouping have always made a point of promoting morris dance as a living tradition. They are traditionally non-traditional.
