= Morris Federation =

Morris dancing association, UK

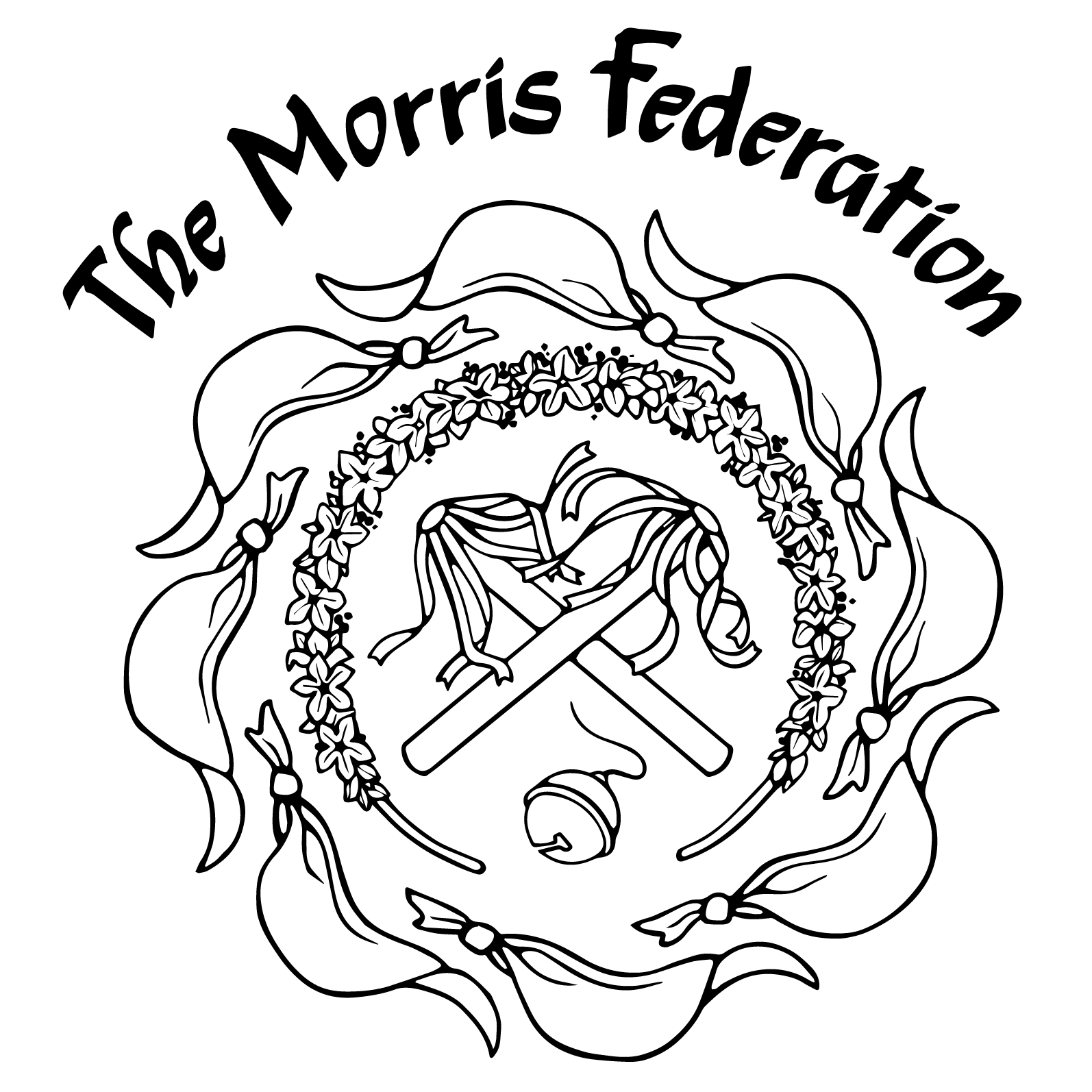
- Formation: October 1975
- Region served: United Kingdom
- President: Pauline Woods-Wilson
- Website: https://www.morrisfed.org.uk/

The Morris Federation, established in 1975, is one of three major organisations supporting morris dancing groups, also known as 'sides', in the United Kingdom. Originally known as the Women's Morris Federation, it was created in response to the Morris Ring's policy of excluding all-female or mixed-gender teams. The federation initially only admitted all-female teams, with its first meeting taking place at the University of Bath in October 1975.

In 1980, the Morris Federation broadened its membership criteria to include mixed-gender teams, and by 1982, it permitted any team to join without gender restrictions. Around this time, the third organization, Open Morris, was formed, adopting an inclusive membership policy from its inception.

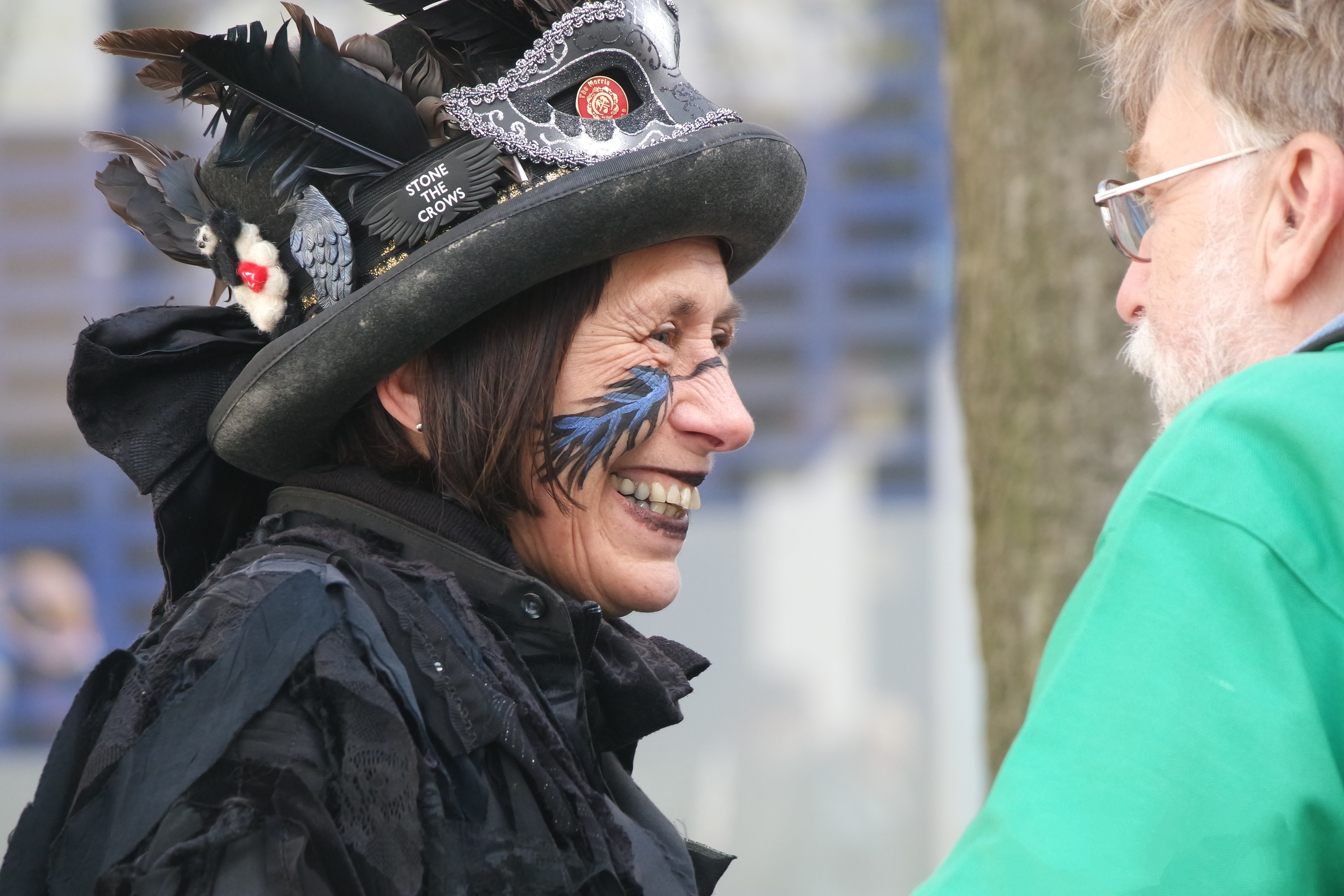
Pauline in "Stone the Crows" morris side kit at one of their dance-outs

The Morris Federation's objectives encompass the promotion of morris dancing and related activities for all interested participants or spectators, the facilitation of communication among member sides, the enhancement of dancing standards and related activities among its members, and the creation of an inclusive, respectful environment for all involved in morris dancing and related activities.

While the Morris Federation primarily serves practicing UK-based morris teams, it also provides membership options for individuals and international teams with an interest in the tradition.

== Online Archive: "Rattle Up, My Boys" ==
The Morris Federation website hosts the online archive of the Rattle Up, My Boys sword dance journal. The archive contains scanned copies of every edition from 1987 to the present, with a rolling 2 year delay behind the current print edition.
