= Earsdon Sword Dance =

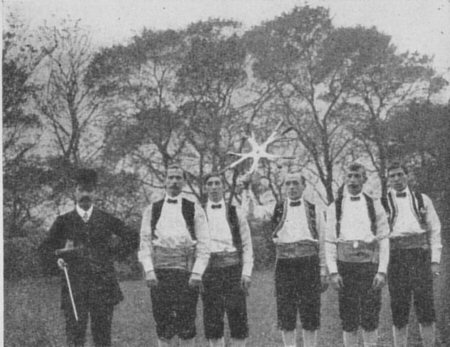
The sword dancers in 1910

The Earsdon Sword Dance is a traditional English folk dance performed by the Royal Earsdon Sword Dancers. They are based in Earsdon, Northumberland, a village about 2 miles (3 km) from the resort town of Whitley Bay.

The Earsdon dance company began around 1800. Since 1829 they have traditionally performed each Christmas for the Dukes of Northumberland at Alnwick Castle. The persons in the team are a Tommy (or Captain) and Bessy (a man dressed as a female) character, five dancers, and a musician who plays the fiddle. The seven performers wear a bright costume whilst the fiddler may wear his normal clothes.

The swords used are two handled swords, the flexible blades of which are approximately twenty-four inches (609 mm) in length and one and one eighth inches (29 mm) in width.

== See also ==
- Tommy and Betty

== Works cited ==
- Cawte, Christopher (1981). "A History of the Rapper Dance". Folk Music Journal. 4 (2).
- Sharp, Cecil J. (1911). The Sword Dances of Northern England, Together with the Horn Dance of Abbots Bromley. London: Novello & Co.
