= Herbert Bedford =

British composer

Herbert Bedford (23 January 1867 – 13 March 1945) was a composer, author, miniature painter and inventor. He was married to the soprano and composer Liza Lehmann from 1894 until her death in 1918. His grandsons were the conductor Steuart Bedford and the composer David Bedford.

== Composer ==
Herbert Bedford attended the City of London School and trained at the Guildhall School of Music. He composed the one-act opera Kit Marlowe (1897), as well as orchestral, choral and chamber music, including a distinctive body of work for solo voice and chamber ensemble. Best known of these was Night Piece No 2 (The Shepherd), for voice (contralto or mezzo), flute, oboe and piano, which won a Carnegie Award in 1925 and was published as part of the Carnegie Collection of British Music. Bedford was also one of the first “serious” composers (another was Gustav Holst) to write original works for military band.

However, his most individual musical interest was in unaccompanied song. With the Romantic tradition (especially Schubert, Schumann and Wagner), intricate accompaniment had come to represent "the internal response to what was being declaimed externally by the voice", leading to an over reliance on the accompaniment. Bedford was concerned with “freeing song from the tyranny of the accompaniment”, and in his 1923 Essay on Modern Unaccompanied Song he listed 41 songs, by Frederic Austin, Eugene Bonnar, Harry Farjeon, Francesca Hall, Jane Joseph, Liza Lehmann, George Oldroyd, Cyril Scott, John Tobin, Felix White, Gerrard Williams and himself. Published as a set by F & B Goodwin, these were laid out with each phrase on its own single line (regardless of length), to make the musical form clearer. Some, including Yeats settings by Bedford, were performed during the Goossens Chamber Concert series at the Aeolian Hall in 1923 by contralto Esther Coleman. Bedford's interest in unaccompanied song was less akin to German expressionist Sprechstimme techniques (as some have suggested) and closer in spirit to monodic folksong and oriental melody.

In 1935 Bedford won the Brahms Medal, the first English composer to do so, though the reasons for the award (given to eight international composers that year rather than the usual one German or Austrian) were more political then musical. This was connected to the controversial founding of the Permanent Council for the International Co-operation of Composers under Richard Strauss, of which Bedford acted as co-Secretary. This organisation was accused at the time of furthering Nazi Party cultural ambitions, set up in opposition to the non-political International Society for Contemporary Music. Bedford defended its neutrality.

== Artist, author and inventor ==
Bedford became known as an artist before he was successful as a composer, exhibiting his works in London, Paris and New York. He mainly produced miniatures and small portraits, such as those collected in his book The Heroines of George Meredith (1914) and the coloured frontispiece and illustrations for his wife Liza Lehmann's posthumous memoirs, published in 1919. He also frequently illustrated the distinctive covers of his wife's songs.

As an author Bedford published Robert Schumann, His Life and Works in 1925. Marrying text and images, the Chart of the Arts came out in 1938 in the form of a folding linen-backed chart, illustrating music, painting, poetry, sculpture and architecture from the 5th Century BC to 1900. Copies are now hard to get hold of.

During the First World War, Herbert Bedford held a commission with the Royal Naval Volunteer Reserve, where he was concerned with London's anti-aircraft defences. While there he invented an anti aircraft ranging device which the War Office adopted for the instruction of all AA gunnery officers.

== Personal life and family ==
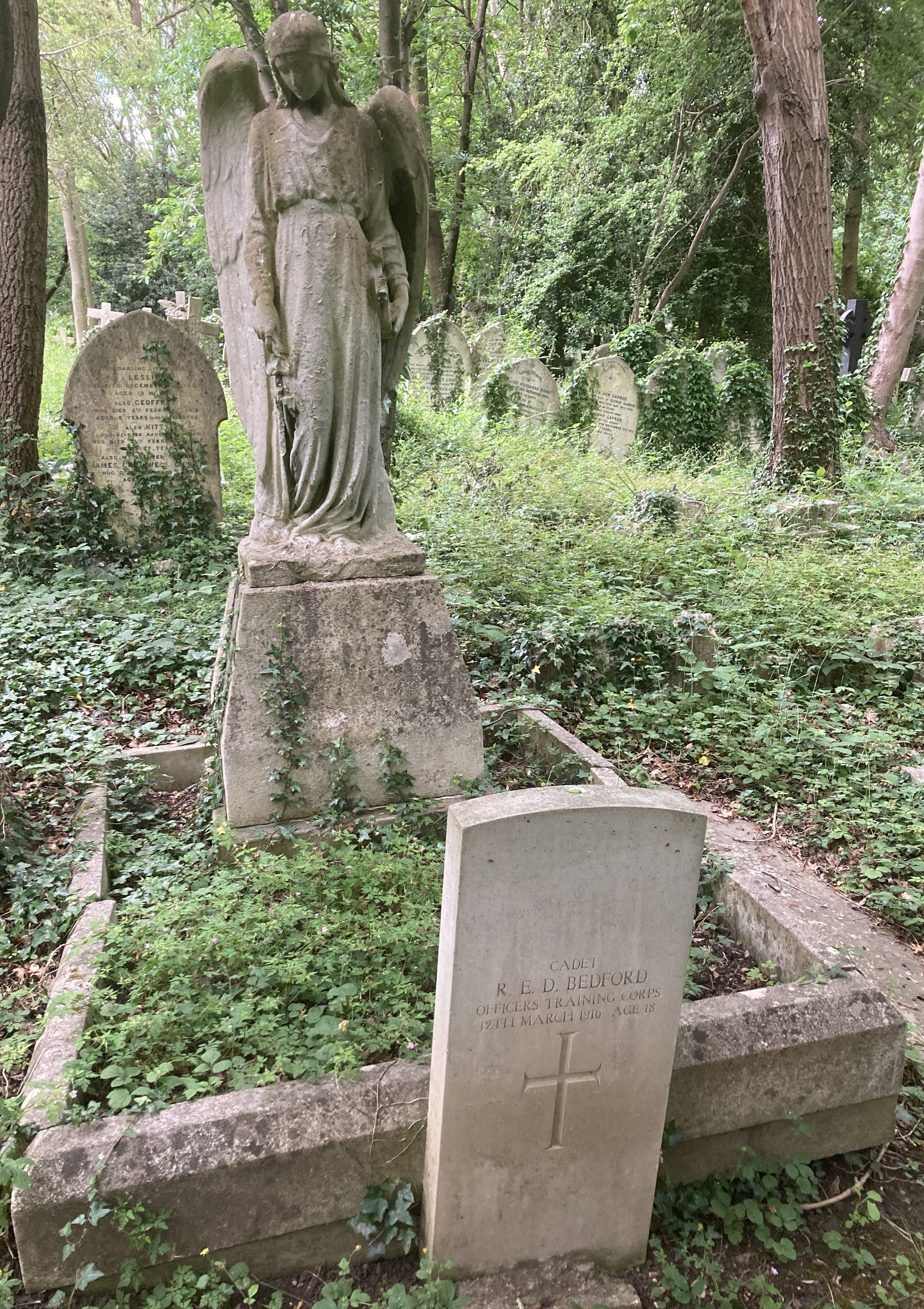
Grave of Herbert Bedford in Highgate Cemetery

Bedford married Liza Lehmann after she had retired as a singer in 1894, when she turned to composing. They had two sons, the older one (Rudolph) died in training during the First World War. The younger, Leslie Herbert Bedford (1900–1989) carried on his father's tradition of inventing and played a key role in the development of radar. He married the soprano (and close friend of Benjamin Britten) Lesley Duff. Their three sons were the conductor Steuart Bedford, the composer David Bedford and the singer Peter Lehmann Bedford (1931-2001).

Herbert Bedford is buried with Liza Lehmann on the eastern side of Highgate Cemetery (grave 40196, grid square 106). The grave of their son Rudolph, marked by a Commonwealth War Graves Commission headstone, is also there.

== List of works ==
- April Songs, nine songs for voice and piano (1894) various poets
- Piano Quintet (1894)
- Kit Marlowe, an opera (1898), based on the play by W L Courtney
- Berceuse for violin and piano (1899)
- Sowing the Wind, overture (1900)
- Love Scene from Romeo and Juliet for contralto, baritone and orchestra (Norwich Festival, 1902)
- Melodie Solenelle for strings (1905)
- Vox Veris, for soprano and orchestra (text Alfred Percival Graves) (1913)
- The Optimist, symphonic fantasy (1922)
- Three Roundels for military band (1922)
- Unaccompanied songs: Aedh Wishes for the Cloths of Heaven, The Heart has Chambers Twain, The Last of the Leaves on the Bough, Meditation Among the Trees, Ships That Pass in the Night, The Unlessoned Lover (1922-4)
- Over the Hills for military band (1923)
- Three Songs with Strings ('Homecoming', 'To a Waterlily at Evening', 'Captivity' (1924)
- Night Piece No 1 (The Dance) for voice, string quartet and bass triangle (1924)
- Night Piece No 2 (The Shepherd) for voice and chamber ensemble (1925)
- La Belle Dame Sans Merci, Dramatic Idyl for voice viola and piano (1925)
- The Lonely Dancer of Gedar: oriental dance for small orchestra, op 36 (pub. 1926)
- Divertimento for piano and strings, op 44 (pub.1926)
- Peribanou, Chinese ballet (1927)
- Proposals, song cycle (1928)
- Lyric Interlude ‘Pathways of the Moon’, op 50 for chamber ensemble (1929)
- Hamadryad, tone poem (1929)
- Chinese Comedy Suite (1931)
- Intermezzo-Concertante for orchestra (1937)

(dates uncertain)

- The Daughters of Dawn (masque)
- Fier Comme un Beau Reve d'Artiste, song with violin obbligato (before 1925)
- Forest Pageant for orchestra (before 1925)
- Mask of Gold (Chinese ballet)
- Nocturne for horn and small orchestra (before 1925)
- Nocturne for six female voices, horn, harp and drums
- Ode to Music, baritone solo and orchestra
- Prelude to a Tragedy
- Queen Mab suite
- Summer Dawn, alto solo with strings and harp (before 1925)
