= Carnegie Collection of British Music =

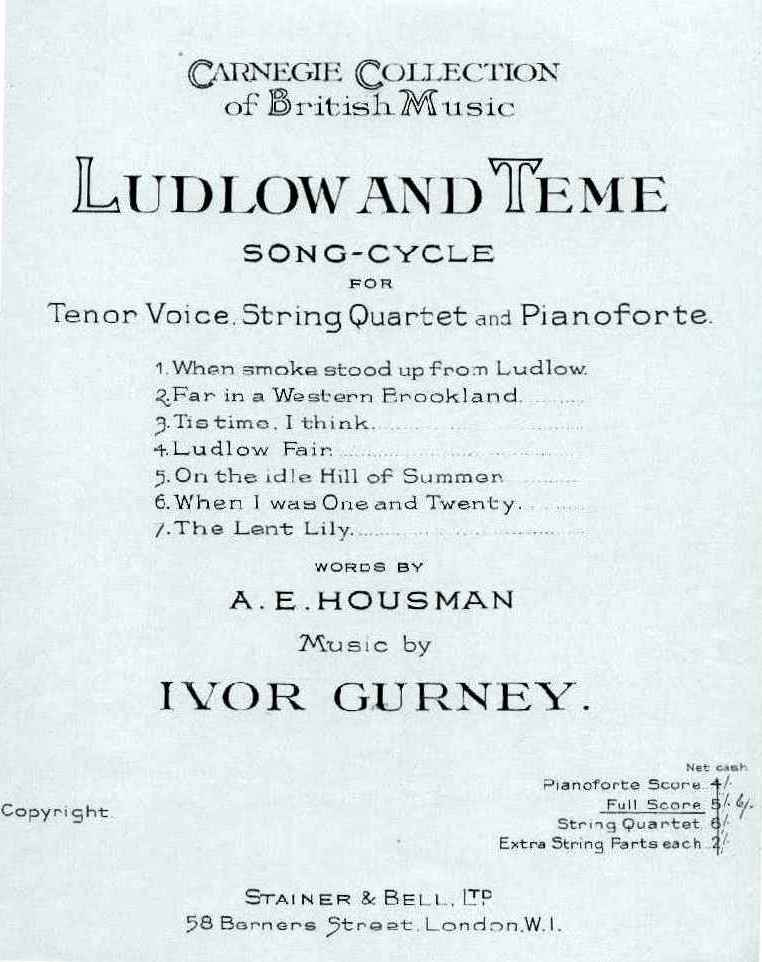
The song cycle Ludlow and Teme by Ivor Gurney setting A.E. Housman, published in 1919

The Carnegie Collection of British Music was founded in 1917 by the Carnegie Trust to encourage the publication of large scale British musical works. Composers were asked to submit their manuscripts to an anonymous panel. On the panel at various times were Hugh Allen, Granville Bantock, Arnold Bax, Dan Godfrey, Henry Hadow and Donald Tovey. Up to six works per year were chosen for an award – publication at the expense of the Trust, in conjunction with music publishers Stainer & Bell. Unfortunately the war delayed things for the earliest prizewinners. The first to be published (in 1918) was the Piano Quartet in A minor by Herbert Howells. (It caught the attention of the young William Walton, who successfully submitted his own Piano Quartet to the panel six years later). By the end of 1920 some 13 works were available. 30 were out by the end of 1922, and when the scheme finally closed in 1928 some 60 substantial works that might not otherwise have seen the light of day had been issued under the Carnegie Collection of British Music imprint.

Not all the works published were new and unknown. Some, such as Vaughan Williams' London Symphony and Rutland Boughton's opera The Immortal Hour were already long established pieces. Stanford's Fifth Symphony, composed almost 30 years before, hadn't kept its place in the repertoire, but was published in recognition of the influential composer and teacher at the very end of his life. Ernest Farrar, who died in 1918, was posthumously awarded publications in 1921 and 1925. However, many of the lesser known works and their composers have been all but forgotten today. A collection of most (over 50) of the scores is held at the Maughan Library (part of King's College London) on the Strand.

In 1995 the BBC broadcast three programmes on the Carnegie Collection, providing the first modern recordings of some of the most neglected works. These included Edgar Bainton's Before Sunrise, Norman Hay's String Quartet in A, Ina Boyle's The Magic Harp, R O Morris' Quartet in A, Lawrence Collingwood's Poeme symphonique, Edward Mitchell's Fantasy Overture and John McEwen's Solway Symphony.

== Scores published ==
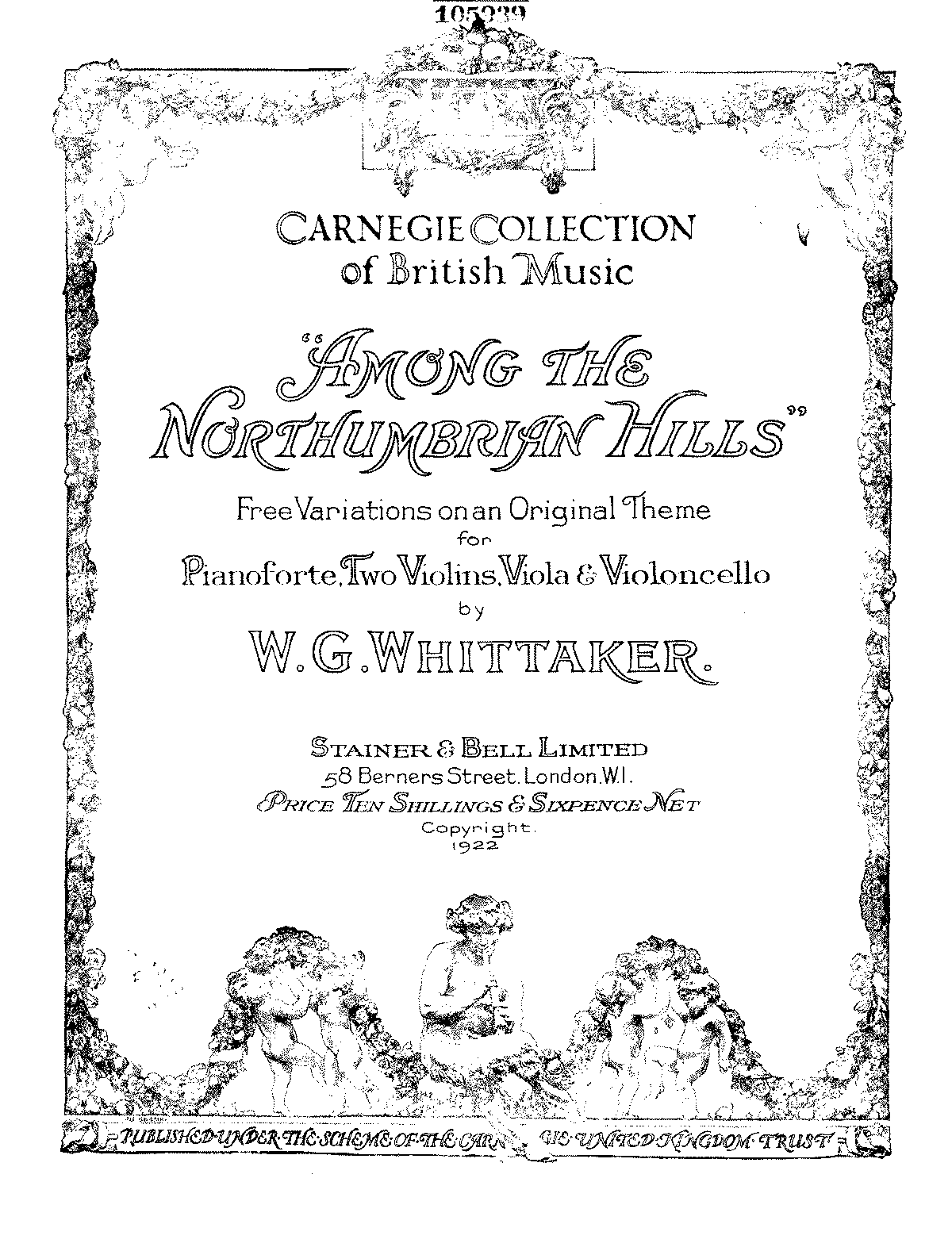
Among the Northumbrian Hills, by W G Whittaker, published in 1922

Edgar Bainton

- Concerto Fantasia, piano and orchestra (1920)
- Before Sunrise, symphony for contralto solo, chorus, and orchestra (1922)

Granville Bantock

- Hebridean Symphony (1915, published 1920)

Herbert Bedford

- Night Piece No 2 (The Shepherd), for voice (contralto or mezzo), flute, oboe, and piano (1925)

Arthur Benjamin

- Pastoral Fantasy, for string quartet (1924)

Arthur Bliss

- Rhapsody for flute, cor anglais, string quartet, bass and two voices, soprano and tenor (1921)

Rutland Boughton

- The Immortal Hour, music-drama (1914, published 1923)

York Bowen

- String Quartet No 2 in D minor, op 41 (1922)

Ina Boyle

- The Magic Harp, orchestral rhapsody (1919, published 1922)

Sam Hartley Braithwaite

- Snow Picture, for orchestra (1924)
- Elegy, for orchestra (1927)

Frank Bridge

- The Sea, suite for orchestra (1910–11, published 1920)

Alan Bush

- String Quartet in A minor, op 4 (1925)

Lawrence Collingwood

- Poeme Symphonique, for orchestra (1918, published 1921)

Learmont Drysdale

- Tam o’Shanter, concert overture (1891, published 1921)

Thomas Dunhill

- The Enchanted Garden, opera in one act, op 65 (1925)

George Dyson

- Three Rhapsodies, for string quartet, op 7 (1920)

David Evans

- Concerto for String Orchestra, op 7 (1928)

Harry Farjeon

- St Dominic Mass, for choir, orchestra, solo soprano, tenor and solo violin, op 51 (1923)
- Phantasy Concerto, for piano and chamber orchestra, op 64 (1926)

Ernest Farrar

- English Pastoral Impressions, suite for orchestra (1921)
- Three Spiritual Studies, for string orchestra, op 33 (1925)

Gerald Finzi

- A Severn Rhapsody, for chamber orchestra (1924)

Nicholas Gatty

- Prince Ferelon, or, The Princess’s Suitors: a musical extravaganza in one act

Cecil Armstrong Gibbs

- The Blue Peter: a comic opera in one act (1925)

Ivor Gurney

- The Western Playland: song-cycle for baritone voice, string quartet and piano (1926)
- Ludlow and Teme, song-cycle for tenor voice, string quartet and piano (1919)

W H Harris

- The Hound of Heaven, for baritone solo, chorus & orchestra (1919)

Edward Norman Hay

- String Quartet in A major (1920)

Victor Hely-Hutchinson

- Variations, Intermezzo, Scherzo & Finale, for orchestra (1927)

Gustav Holst

- The Hymn of Jesus, for two choruses, semi-chorus and full orchestra, op 37 (1919)

Herbert Howells

- Piano Quartet in A minor, op 21 (1918)
- Rhapsodic Quintet, clarinet quintet, op 31 (1921)

John Blackwood McEwen

- Solway Symphony (1911, published 1922)

Jeffrey Mark

- Scottish Suite, for violins and piano (1928)

Percy Hilder Miles

- Sextet in G minor (1920)

Robin Milford

- Double Fugue for Orchestra, op 10 (1927)

Edward Mitchell

- Fantasy Overture, for orchestra (with six horns) (1922)

R O Morris

- Fantasy, for string quartet (1922)

Cyril Rootham

- Brown Earth, for chorus and orchestra (1922-3, published 1929)
- Ode on the Morning of Christ’s Nativity, for chorus and orchestra (1927-8, published 1929)

Alec Rowley

- The Princess Who Lost a Tune, ballet-mime (1927)

Cyril Scott

- Nativity Hymn, for chorus and orchestra (1923)
- Piano Quintet [No. 1] (1920, published 1925)

Charles Villiers Stanford

- Symphony No 5 in D major (1894, published 1923)
- The Travelling Companion, opera in four acts, op 146 (1916, published 1925)

Ralph Vaughan Williams

- A London Symphony (1914, published 1920)

Alfred M Wall

- Quartet for Piano & Strings in C minor (1920)

William Walton

- Piano Quartet in A minor (1924)

Peter Warlock

- The Curlew, song cycle for tenor solo, flute, English horn, and string quartet (1924)

Felix Harold White

- The Nymph’s Complaint for oboe (or violin), viola & piano (1922)
- Four Proverbs, for flute, oboe violin, viola and cello (1925)

W G Whittaker

- Among the Northumbrian Hills, free variations on an original theme for piano and string quartet (1922)
- A Lyke-Wake Dirge, for chorus and orchestra (1925)

Stanley Wilson

- A Skye Symphony, op 38 (1928)

Leslie Woodgate

- Two Hymns, for baritone solo, men’s voices, strings, piano and organ (1923)
  - 'A Hymn to the Virgin' (words, anon.)
  - 'The White Island' (words Herrick)
