= Edward Mitchell (pianist) =

British pianist and composer

Edward Mitchell (1891–1950) was a British pianist and composer best known for his interpretations of Russian piano music between the 1910s and the 1940s. After the First World War he became assistant organist at Westminster Cathedral. He taught at the Royal College of Music from 1921 until his death in 1950.

Mitchell's all Scriabin recitals in the 1920s and 1930s were highly regarded – he once proclaimed Scriabin "the greatest composer since Beethoven" – and he often turned these into lecture-recitals in order to make the challenging music more intelligible to the public. Sometimes he would talk about a piece and play it twice, as he did with the Sonata, op. 64 at the Mortimer Hall, New Bond Street on 22 March 1921. He compiled a catalogue of Scriabin's piano music.

Mitchell performed the first complete performance of Medtner's Sonata-Triad in the UK at the Aeolian Hall on 3 February 1922, along with the first performance of his own Sonata Fantasy. He was also an early advocate of the music of Sergei Lyapunov, performing and broadcasting his Douze études d'exécution transcendente. Mitchell would occasionally include piano compositions by John Ireland in his recitals.

As a composer Mitchell's greatest success was the 13 minute long Fantasy Overture for orchestra with six horns, which was first performed in 1922. It won a Carnegie Trust award and was published as part of the Carnegie Collection of British Music. Other works (now entirely forgotten) include the orchestral overture Spirit of Youth, and piano works such as the Sonata Fantasy (1922), Six Studies, Poem: Autumn, Valse Sérieuse (published Elkin, 1921), Witches' Dance and the Two Sketches 'Reverie' and 'Fantasy Dance' (published Elkin, 1921). There were also some songs including Clouds and Yet Look on Me (a setting of Shelley). The Fantasy Overture was revived for its first modern performance in 1995 by the BBC Concert Orchestra conducted by Barry Wordsworth. An archived recording exists.
