= Sam Hartley Braithwaite =

British composer and artist

Sam Hartley Braithwaite (20 July 1883 – 13 January 1947) was a British composer and artist.

== Life and career ==
Braithwaite was born at West Croft, Main Street, Egremont in Cumberland and educated at St Bees School. His parents were the surgeon Samuel Braithwaite and his wife Eleanor Elizabeth (née Hartley). He was the fourth of six children.

He trained at the Royal Academy of Music, studying clarinet with George Clinton, piano with Cuthbert Whitemore (1877-1927) and organ - as well as composition with Frederick Corder An exact contemporary there was Arnold Bax. They became close friends and Bax dedicated his piano piece Apple Blossom Time (1915) to Braithwaite. While still in his twenties he began teaching piano at the RAM, where his pupils included Eric Coates, only three years his junior. He was musical director of the Passmore Edwards Settlement (Mary Ward Centre) in London from 1910 to 1913, succeeding Holst.

From 1901 Braithwaite was living at 8 Rossiter Road in Streatham. Ten years later his address was 37, Tavistock Place, just off Russell Square. At the end of the First World War, partly for health reasons, Braithwaite moved to Bournemouth. He had been appointed to the staff of the Bournemouth School of Music in 1914: his taking up of the position may have been delayed by the war. Many of his works were performed there, often conducted by him. He also occasionally wrote about music, as in his 1927 review 'Modern Music' in Musical Quarterly. But the change in location also marked his development of a parallel career in etching, painting and printmaking. By 1933 he was living at Hillingdon, Brunstead Road in Poole with his mother, his brother Henry, and his sister, Jessie.

During the 1940s Braithwaite returned to the Lake District where he lived at Primrose Cottage, Carr Bank, Beetham, Westmoreland. There he became a member of the Lake Artists Society. He died in Arnside, Westmorland, aged 64.

== Music and painting ==
Two of his compositions - the characteristically pictorial Snow Picture for orchestra (1924) and the Elegy for orchestra (1927) - won Carnegie Trust awards and were published as part of the Carnegie Collection of British Music. (There is also an arrangement of Snow Picture for keyboard, two players by Leslie Woodgate). His Overture for military band was written for the Pageant of Empire at the Crystal Palace in 1911. The 14 minute long orchestral scherzo A Night By Dalegarth Bridge was performed for the first time in Bournemouth in 1921 and repeated the following year. Braithwaite stayed in Bournemouth during the Second World War, performing in and composing for the newly founded Wessex Philharmonic Orchestra.

There is currently only one modern recording of his music, the Pastoral Lullaby for horn and organ

As an artist Braithwaite made etchings of landscapes in Dorset and Lancashire. He exhibited with the New Forest Group formed in 1923. During the 1920s and 1930s his paintings were occasionally shown in London, at the Fine Art Society (1932–37) and twice at the Royal Academy of Arts (1933 & 1937, the latter with his watercolour Chepstow Castle). The painting is now at the Royal Academy of Music. Some of his paintings, such as Foxtrot and Pavan (both exhibited at the Arlington Gallery, Old Bond Street, London in 1927) were more abstract with musical themes.

== List of Works ==
- 13th Psalm, baritone voice and string orchestra
- 23rd Psalm, unaccompanied chorus
- Chopinesque, mazurka for piano duet (1937)
- Dawn in Fairyland, soprano and alto solos, female chorus and orchestra
- Elegy for orchestra (pub. 1927, fp. Bournemouth)
- Elfin Fountain, for piano (1923)
- English Dance, piano
- Fantasia in C minor, for piano (1917)
- The Fighting Temeraire, nautical overture for orchestra (fp. Bournemouth, 1919)
- Idyll for orchestra
- Intermezzo: In A Cottage Garden for piano (1917)
- Invention for piano or harpsichord (pub. 1951)
- Musical Box with two tunes (pub. 1940)
- A Night By Dalegarth Bridge, symphonic scherzo for orchestra (1921)
- Nocturne for piano (1944)
- On a Summer's Day (fp. Bournemouth Festival, 8 February 1923)
- Oriental Fragment for orchestra
- Overture for military band (1911)
- Pastorale for piano duet (pub. 1937)
- Pastorale and Fantasia for organ
- Pastoral Lullaby for horn and organ (pub. 1949)
- Poem, soprano voice and piano
- Prelude in the style of the 18th Century, for piano duet (pub. 1937)
- Prelude to a Drama (1940)
- Quintet in one movement for clarinet and strings
- Serenade for piano (1944)
- Snow Picture for orchestra (pub. 1924, fp. Bournemouth)
- Suite of Ancient Dances for piano
- Three Short Pieces for small orchestra (fp. Bournemouth, 1922)
  - 'By the Hot Lake', scherzo
  - 'Near an Eastern Bazaar'
  - 'Nautical Picture'
