= R. O. Morris =

English composer and teacher (1886–1948)

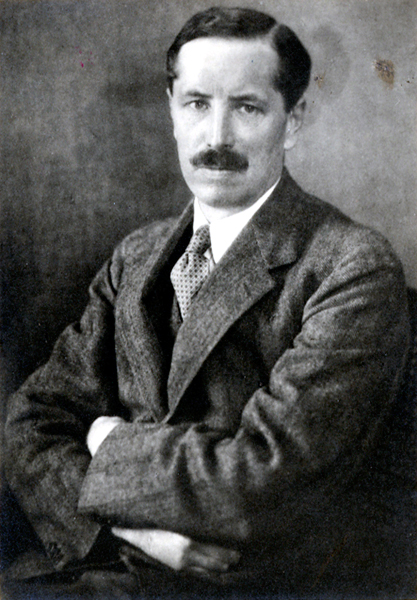

Reginald Owen Morris (3 March 1886 – 15 December 1948), known professionally and by his friends by his initials, as R.O. Morris, was a British composer and teacher.

== Teacher and author ==
Morris was born in York, son of Army officer Reginald Frank Morris and Georgiana Susan (née Sherard). He was educated at Harrow School, New College, Oxford and the Royal College of Music (RCM) in London. On the outbreak of World War I, he enlisted in the Duke of Cornwall's Light Infantry, along with his friends George Butterworth and Geoffrey Toye. After a time writing for The Nation as music critic, he rejoined the RCM as a professor of counterpoint and composition in 1920. From 1926 for two years he taught at the Curtis Institute in Philadelphia before returning to the RCM.

Morris became famous as an exceptional teacher of counterpoint, and wrote several texts including Contrapuntal Technique in the Sixteenth Century (Oxford, 1922), Foundations of Practical Harmony and Counterpoint (London, 1925), Figured Harmony at the Keyboard (London, 1931), The Structure of Music (London, 1935) and Introduction to Counterpoint (London, 1944). His students included the composers Hugo Cole, Jean Coulthard, Gerald Finzi, Sir Michael Tippett, Constant Lambert, Robin Milford, Anthony Milner, Edmund Rubbra and Bernard Stevens.

== Composer ==
His compositions have been overshadowed by his formidable reputation as a teacher. However, Morris enjoyed ten years of creativity as a composer roughly between 1922 and 1932, writing symphonic and chamber music, songs, and choral works. One of the first, the Fantasy String Quartet in A, won a Carnegie Trust Award and was published as part of the Carnegie Collection of British Music.

Gerald Finzi thought highly of his music, and in an obituary piece (quoted in Diana McVeagh’s biography of Finzi) he chose four pieces representing Morris at his most approachable –Corrina’s Maying for chorus and orchestra, the Concerto Piccolo, the Suite for Chamber Orchestra and the six Canzoni Ricercati for string orchestra or string quartet – with the Toccata and Fugue for Orchestra at the other extreme and the Symphony in D (first performed on 1 January 1934 at the Queen’s Hall) somewhere in the middle. According to Stephen Banfield, Finzi regarded the last of the Canzoni Ricercati as Morris's "one genuine masterpiece” and described it as a "grave and lovely" work.

Much of his most powerful music is contrapuntally-led, as in the final Chaconne of the Sinfonia in C, the intense fugal and canonic writing of the Canzoni Ricercati No 6 (using themes that maintain the flavor of mournful folk melodies), or the first movement of the Symphony in D, where the coda develops into a masterly canon. But in the early 1930s, Morris stopped composing and would never talk about his own compositions from that point onwards. Today he is generally known for just one work, the hymn tune Hermitage, used as the melody for the carol Love Came Down at Christmas.

The Sinfonia in C was revived at the English Music Festival in Dorchester Abbey on 27 May 2022, with the BBC Concert Orchestra conducted by Martin Yates.

== Personal life ==
Beyond music, Morris set crosswords for The Times and edited the 1914 Oxford University Press edition of R D Blackmore's novel Lorna Doone.

In February 1915, Morris married Emmie Fisher, thus becoming brother-in-law to Vaughan Williams, who had married her sister Adeline. For many years in the 1920s and 1930s, Morris lived at 30 Glebe Place, very close to Vaughan Williams and Adeline. He later moved to 2, Addison Gardens in Kensington, where he died suddenly in December 1948, having been examining at the Royal College of Music the day before with no sign of anything wrong.

== Works ==
Orchestral and chamber

- 1922 Fantasy for string quartet
- 1925 Motet for string quartet (fp 7 June 1925)
- 1928-9 Sinfonia in C Major
- 1930 Concerto piccolo for two violins and string orchestra
- 1930 Concerto in G minor for Violin and Orchestra
- 1931 Canzoni Ricercati for string quartet or string orchestra
- 1932 Partita Lidica (Suite for Violoncello and Orchestra in F major)
- 1934 Symphony in D
- Toccata and Fugue for Orchestra

Choral

- 1925 Love came down at Christmas (tune Hermitage)
- 1928 See amid the winter's snow (tune Winter's Snow)
- 1929 Six English Folk-Songs ('Seventeen Come Sunday', 'Brisk young sailor' (two versions) 'The lawyer', 'Tarry trousers', 'The cuckoo')
- 1930 There is a Garden (words Thomas Campion), TTBB
- 1931 Five English Folk-Songs ('Blow away the Morning Dew', 'Cold Blows the Wind', 'High Germany', 'The Turtle-Dove', 'The Mare and the Foal')
- 1932 Since thou, O fondest and truest (words Robert Bridges), SATB
- 1932 Hunting Song (words Walter Scott), TTBB
- 1933 Corinna's Maying. (words Robert Herrick), SATB (also version with orchestral accompaniment)
