= Gerrard Williams =

English composer and arranger(1888–1947)

John Gerrard Williams (10 December 1888 – 7 March 1947), most commonly known as Gerrard Williams, was an English composer and arranger.

== Life ==
Williams was born in London - his birth name was John Gerrard Williams. He had no formal music education (other than some informal advice from Richard Henry Walthew), but learned through amateur performing in choirs and orchestras and through concert going. He trained and worked as an architect, though began composing in his spare time from around 1911.

He gave up architecture after 1920, and began organising concerts of his music. These included a concert at the Pump Room in Bath on 2 February 1921. 16 of his songs were sung by the tenor Osmond Davis with the composer at the piano. The tenor, Vladimir Rosing, premiered his song Idyll at Aeolian Hall in New York on 8 February 1922, The Musical Leader calling it "extraordinary." A further concert of his chamber music, including the second string quartet, piano works and songs, was held at the Aeolian Hall in London on 27 March 1922. In 1924 the BBC broadcast an hour long programme of his chamber music, and another hour of orchestral and choral music in 1928, conducted by Stanford Robinson.

He was also a prolific arranger of folk-songs and folk-dance tunes, as well as adaptions of popular classics. His arrangements for military band in the 1930s include the Eric Coates' London Suite for Chappell & Co. He also arranged the suite from the 1937 Arthur Bliss ballet Checkmate for wind orchestra.

In the 1930s Williams was living at Underhill, Stafford Road in Caterham. He died in Oxted, Surrey at the age of 58.

== Music ==
His many compositions include a comic operetta for children The Story of the Willow Pattern Plate (1921), and the ballad opera Kate, The Cabin Boy, based on traditional tunes and inspired by the success of the Beggar's Opera revival in 1920. It was produced by Donald Calthrop at the Kingsway Theatre in 1924. There are orchestral suites, incidental music for radio, chamber music, including two string quartets, choral works, solo piano pieces and songs. Much of his music could be classified as light music miniatures, but folk music is also an important component, while the influence of Debussy and Ravel is sometimes noted in connection with the piano works and chamber music.

Pot-Pourri, the orchestrated version of a piano suite with eight short movements titled after the names of flowers, was given at the Proms twice, in 1921 and 1922. Williams also wrote one of the movements of Captions: Five Glimpses of an Anonymous Theme (1923), a suite with other movements by Herbert Bedford, Arthur Bliss, Eugene Goossens and Felix Harold White.

=== Selected works ===
Dramatic

- Charming Chloe, ballad opera
- Kate, the Cabin Boy, ballad opera (1923)
- The Story of the Willow Pattern Plate, comic operetta for children (1921)
- Sweet Winter, for children
- The Tale of the Shoe, for children

Orchestra

- Cortege on a Ground Bass
- Elegiac Rhapsody, in Memoriam E.B.W.
- Facets: Aspects of an Original Theme
- Fantasy on Kalyani (an old Indian Song), for flute, oboe, clarinet and strings
- Pot-Pourri, eight fragments (originally piano)
- Ring Up the Curtain: A Harlequinade (originally piano)
- The Wings of Horus (1928), ballet

Chamber

- String Quartet No 1 (1915)
- String Quartet No 2 (1919, published Curwen)

Piano

- Déjeuner dansant
- Four Traditional Irish Tunes
- Four Traditional Tunes (also orchestrated)
- Poem for piano solo ('Questing') (1927)
- Prunes and Prisms: Three Expressions
- Side-shows
- Three Miniatures after Shelley ('Dawn', 'The Isle', 'Time', Chester, 1919 - also orchestrated)
- Three Preludes: 'By Haworth Falls', 'Solitude' and 'Autumn'

Songs

- Aubade (text Frederick Wyville Home, Curwen, 1921)
- The Crooning from Inisfail (text Leigh Henry, Curwen, 1921)
- Dusk
- Idyll
- An Inconsequent Ballad
- In the Bower (text Tennyson)
- Love's Secret (text Blake)
- Moon
- Mid-winter Madness
- Playbox, song cycle for children
- Reflections (text Leigh Henry, Curwen, 1921)
- Rondel (text Swinburne)
- Very Nearly (text Queenie Scott-Hopper, 1932)

Choral

- A Cycle of the Sea for eight part voices
- Diaphenia, part song
- Lowland Lay, part song
- Sweet Kate, part song
- Three Sleeps, part song
- Tragic Fragment, for wordless women's voices
