= Tommy and Betty =

Roles in rapper sword dance

Tommy and Betty are two roles in rapper sword dance that represent the father and mother of the dancers. The Tommy and Betty often introduce the dance to the audience and seek to engage the audience. As with so many traditional dances in England and Europe, these characters are integral to the tradition, and their role was documented in all of the earliest published descriptions of the Northumbrian dance – descriptions which pre-date the introduction of the flexible rapper sword which so fundamentally changed the dance.

In early accounts of the sword dance in the Tyne Valley, the Tommy character was generally called "The Captain", and the Betty character called "Bessy". There were often additional characters, such as a doctor, who took part in a short play before the dance, similar to a Mummers play. The Tommy was either dressed up formally, with waistcoat, tailcoat and top hat, or in a grotesque garb of animal hides; occasionally, the Tommy was dressed in women's clothing, like the Betty. Much is made of their role and clothing in the context of pagan fertility rituals; it is certainly probable that the characters and play are older than the sword dance itself, which would appear to have been appended to the older play tradition found all over England.

In the modern dance, the Tommy introduces the dancers, usually with a traditional calling-on song, and then provides a running commentary and/or jokes to entertain the audience. The Tommy and Betty characters often join in with the rapper figures.

The best known Tommy and Betty characters are probably the Newcastle Kingsmen's characters, who have won the prize for best characters at several of the annual DERT competitions, including the national DERT 2004 and 2005 competitions.

The Newcastle Kingsmen's dance begins with the Tommy character singing the "Calling On Song". The Betty character then joins in halfway through the dance - this delayed entrance (which is unusual in rapper sword teams) allows time for the Tommy to work through a repertoire of jokes, before the appearance of the Betty. The Betty seeks to have a high profile entrance such as appearing through a trap door, on a bicycle or carrying a vacuum cleaner. This entrance can help re-engage the audience; this is particularly valuable in large arenas or at foreign festivals.
