= Felix Harold White =

English composer, music teacher, and pianist

Felix Harold White (27 April 1884 – 31 January 1945) was an English composer, music teacher and pianist.

== Early career and war ==
White was born in Fetcham, Surrey into a Jewish family originally called Weiss. He was the oldest of five children, and initially worked with his coal merchant father and his brothers transporting coal around Surrey. But his mother had taught him piano from the age of five and he made rapid progress, and soon developed a career as a music teacher. Other than that he was largely self taught, though Hubert Parry took an interest in his work and helped secure some early performances.

In 1914, White married Marta Scholten, a Swiss-German, and in 1916 he registered as a conscientious objector. For the rest of the war he was sent off away from his family to work on a farm in Cornwall, and then to another farm in Hemel Hempstead. His Fanfare for a Challenge to Accepted Ideas of 1921 was inspired by his resistance to the war and militarism.

== Post war ==
Before and during the war White was living in Kingston-upon-Thames. During the 1920s, White and his family were living at 28, Hilldrop Crescent, London N7.

Between 1933 and 1935 White played with the London Philharmonic Orchestra as piano, harpsichord and celeste player, and as a répétiteur at Covent Garden under Sir Thomas Beecham. He published A Dictionary of Musical Terms (1934), wrote composer monographs and edited the piano works of Scriabin. There was some renewed attention to White's orchestral output from the BBC in the late 1930s, but then came the Second World War and his composition tailed off. He became somewhat embittered about the lack of interest in his serious works. He died in London.

== Works ==
One of his first successes as a composer was a performance of his orchestral overture Shylock under Henry Wood at the Proms on 26 September 1907. The composer described it as "a little 'Straussy' here and there", but it was well received by the Proms audience, with White called back to the platform three times. His Romance in D for cello and piano was also performed in December 1907 at the Bechstein Hall alongside pieces by George Dyson, Joseph Holbrooke and Hubert Bath. And the orchestral tone poem Astarte Syriaca, a musical commentary on a sonnet and painting by Rossetti, secured its first performance at a Queen's Hall Patron's Fund concert on 23 January 1911.

Further orchestral works followed the ending of the war, including the orchestral Impressions of England (written for the 1918 Proms, but seemingly not performed), a tone poem The Deserted Village (1923, unperformed), and the first performance of Meditation, first planned in 1911, revised in 1920 and given by Dan Godfrey at Bournemouth in 1923. White also contributed a movement to Captions: Five Glimpses of an Anonymous Theme (1923), a suite with other movements by Herbert Bedford, Arthur Bliss, Eugene Goossens and Gerrard Williams.

But chamber music, solo piano pieces and songs were his primary focus after the war. Two chamber works won the Carnegie Trust award and were published in the Carnegie Collection of British Music series, The Nymph's Complaint (1921) and Four Proverbs (1925). There have been three recordings of The Nymph's Complaint. His (second?) String Quartet was performed by the Lyra Quartet for the first time in 1935 and broadcast by the BBC. Piano pieces include six suites for piano, such as Neptune and Amphitrite, the Robinson Crusoe Suite and A Dickens Notebook. Up to 250 songs and vocal works were composed but only 50 or so published and the rest mostly lost.

== List of compositions ==
Orchestral

- Shylock, overture (1907)
- Polonaise (1908)
- Astarte Syriaca, tone poem (1909)
- Meditation (1911, revised 1920)
- Suite, four movements (1913)
- Impressions of England, suite (1918)
- Fanfare for a Challenge to Accepted Ideas, brass (1921)
- The Mermaid Tavern, a revel for orchestra (1921) (broadcast 30 October 1936)
- To Miranda, serenade for string orchestra (1921)
- The Deserted Village, tone poem after Goldsmith (1923)
- Two Idylls for small orchestra ('Indoor' and 'Outdoor') (1923)
- Arietta (1929)
- Nocturne (1936)
- Rhapsody on English Airs (1936, first broadcast 29 October 1937)
- Overture (1937)
- Rhapsody No 2 (based on Irish airs) (1938)
- Two English Dances
- Cakes and Ale: suite
- La Charmante, for piano and small orchestra

Chamber

- Romance in D for cello and piano (1907)
- Cello Sonata (1910)
- The Nymph's Complaint for the Death of her Fawn, poem (after Andrew Marvell) for oboe (or violin), viola and piano (1921)
- Dawn study for 12 Cellos (1922, written for Herbert Waleau's cello school)
- Trio for oboe (or violin, viola) and piano (1922)
- Four Japanese Proverbs for flute, oboe, violin, viola, and cello (1922)
- Romance for violin and piano (1928)
- Habanera for flute and piano (1929)
- Suite for four horns (1934)
- String Quartet (1935)
- Orison for four cellos (1937)
- Poem for cello and piano
- Three piano quintets
- Trio in C minor for flute, viola and harp (1942)

Piano

- Thereby hangs a Tale (1913)
- The Tangles of Neaera's Hair (1914)
- Cajolery (1917)
- Time's Bitter Flood (1923)
- The Blossoming Idyll (1925)
- Diversions, suite for piano (1929)
- Off for the holidays, suite for piano (1930)
- A Dickens Notebook
- Neptune and Amphitrite
- Robinson Crusoe Suite
- approximately 100 pieces and six suites for piano

Vocal

- I look into the eyes I love, solo song (1911)
- New life, new love, solo song (1911)
- Golden Slumbers, solo song (1921)
- The Northern Star, song (1921)
- Stephano's Song from "The Tempest", solo song (1922)
- The Song of the Minutes and Little Bo-Peep for children's chorus and piano (1923)
- We cobblers lead a merry life, part song for men's voices (1923)
- The Cockle-Boat, a musical vision for children in one act (1923)
- From the mountains to the champaign, unison chorus and piano (1928)
- also many choral pieces, part songs, solo songs - 250 composed, 50 or so published
