= Edward Norman Hay =

Irish composer and music critic

- Born: 19 April 1889; Faversham, Kent, England
- Died: 10 September 1943 (aged 54) Portstewart, County Londonderry, Northern Ireland
- Genres: Classical
- Occupations: Composer, Music critic
- Instruments: Piano, Violin

Edward Norman Hay (19 April 1889 – 10 September 1943) was a Northern Irish composer and music critic.

== Early life ==
Hay was born at 26 Newton Road, Faversham, Kent, the second son of Joseph Hay, an Inland Revenue official, who was the son of Edward Hay of Coleraine, County Londonderry (d. 1890), coachmaker, and Janet Robb (1864–1891) of Alloa, Scotland, the daughter of Andrew Robb (d.1900), a mill manager.

His parents had married in Edinburgh in 1884, and their first son, Francis Edward Cecil Hay, died in Peebles in 1885. Joseph and Janet moved to Faversham shortly afterwards. His mother Janet died aged only 26 in January 1891 and was buried in North Merchiston Cemetery, Edinburgh, and the 1891 census finds Edward in the Cottage Hospital in Faversham. Edward moved across to Coleraine in Ireland shortly afterwards to be cared for by aunts. When young he contracted polio, which left him with a permanent limp, and apparently unable to walk until the age of 12.

== Education and career ==
According to his own account he first studied the violin at the age of eight, but around the age of ten "I was suddenly filled with a longing to play a keyboard instrument ... and I took a vow one evening not to sleep until I had learnt the notes of the bass staff". He went on to take piano lessons and "during my five years with her [the teacher] I proceeded from Clementi and Dussek to the easier Beethoven, with not one trashy piece in between. And I think the finest thing she ever did was to leave Bach alone".

Hay studied in Belfast, with Francis Koeller and later with Charles John Brennan, Edred Martin Chaundy and Arthur Eaglefield-Hull. He took a bachelor's degree in music at Oxford, and later a doctorate in music at Balliol College, Oxford for composition (1919). He also became a fellow of the Royal College of Organists (1911). Returning to Ireland he was organist at St. Patrick's Parish Church, Coleraine from 1914 to 1916, and thereafter of Bangor Abbey Church in 1922.

In 1922-3 he served as Head of Music at Campbell College, Belfast. From 1923 to 1924 he was the external examiner (degrees) at Trinity College Dublin and shortly before his death was lecturer in music at Queen's University, Belfast. From 1926 he served as the music critic for the Belfast Telegraph using the pseudonym "Rathcol". He also was the general editor and arranger of "Ulster Airs" for BBC Northern Ireland. He was also organist at Belmont Presbyterian Church, Belfast.

He married Hessie Haughey from Coleraine at Fitzroy Avenue Presbyterian Church, Belfast, on 7 April 1920. They had two sons, Michael (1927–2004) and Joseph Norman Haughey Hay (1924–2007).

== Death and legacy ==
Hay died in 1943 in Portstewart, County Londonderry, Northern Ireland. His obituary in The Times (13 September 1943) records that he "won the Carnegie Award for a String Quartet in A in 1918, and from 1923 to 1924 was external examiner for degrees in music at Trinity College Dublin. After working for the BBC for a time he was appointed in 1941 Lecturer on Music, Queen's University Belfast". It continued "Dr Hay's chief work was 'Paean', performed in 1932 at Worcester at the Three Choirs Festival. Notable orchestral works by him are the symphonic poem 'Dunluce (1921)' and an 'Irish Rhapsody'."

Dunluce, mentioned above, was performed at the London Proms in 1925, as was Paean in 1934. His work To Wonder was commissioned for the Belfast Philharmonic Societies Jubilee in 1924, and was performed on the opening of the Belfast Station of the BBC. Other awards include a Feis Ceoil prize for a six-part madrigal in 1908, another Feis Ceoil prize in 1916 for a sonata for violoncello and piano on Irish folk tunes, and in 1917 the Cobbett Prize for a string quartet on Irish folk tunes.

Barry Burgess described Hay's music as having expert orchestration and tonal harmony, described in Hay's own words as "largely diatonic with chromatic decoration in a free modern manner". Burgess also detected the influence of Irish folksongs in his melodic style.

The BBC broadcast a modern performance of Dunluce in March 1987 by the Ulster Orchestra, conducted by Maurice Handford. The 1921 cantata The Wind Among the Reeds (setting Yeats) was given what was billed as its first performance on 7 September 1995 by soprano Melanie Armitstead, the chorus of the Belfast Philharmonic Society and the Ulster Orchestra, conducted by John Lubbock. And a new performance of the String Quartet in A by the Bingham Quartet was broadcast in October 1995. In 2002, his work was performed at Ulster Hall, and his sons were there to hear it.

== Selected compositions ==
Orchestral

- Dunluce, tone poem (1921)
- Fantasy on Irish Folk Tunes (1924)
- Four Irish Sketches (1929–32)
- An Irish Rhapsody (1932)

Vocal with orchestra

- The Gilly of Christ (Joseph Campbell) for chorus and orchestra (1917)
- The Wind Among the Reeds (W. B. Yeats) for mezzo, baritone, chorus and orch. (1921)
- To Wonder (Robert N. D. Wilson) for soprano, alto, tenor, bass, chorus and orch. (1924)
- Paean (George Herbert) for mezzo, chorus and orchestra (1930)

Choral (unaccompanied)

- Shed no Tear (John Keats) (1923)

Choral (with organ)

- Behold, what Manner of Love (biblical) (1923)
- Thou O God hast taught me (1927)

Chamber music

- Cello Sonata, for cello and piano (1916)
- Fantasy on Irish Folk Tunes for string quartet (1917)
- String Quartet in A major (1918). Winner of Carnegie Trust Award

Songs

- The Silent Land for mezzo and cello (1905)
- A Birthday Song (Dante Gabriel Rossetti) for soprano, mezzo and piano (1918)
- Churnin' Day (Elizabeth Shane) for voice and piano (1936)
- The Buttermilk Boy, Ulster folksong for voice and piano (1939)
- Tryste Noel (Louise Imogen Guiney) for soprano and piano (1940)

Musical comedy

- The Lady Voters Dilemma (1919)
