= Rapper sword =

Style of English sword dance

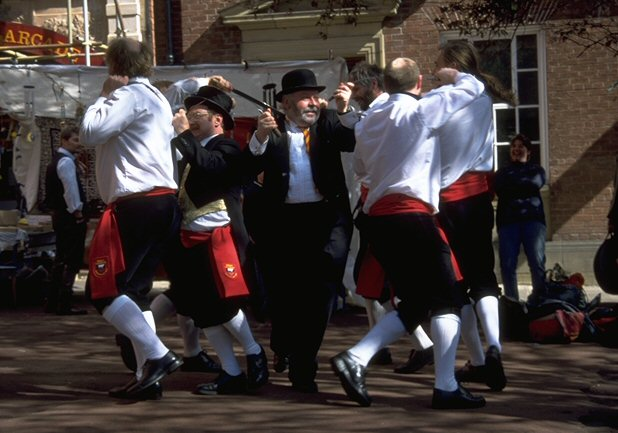
Sallyport Rapper performing in Morpeth 1999.

Rapper sword (also known as short sword dance) is a variation of sword dance that originated in Northeastern England in the pit villages of Tyneside and Wearside, where miners first performed the tradition. The dance is related to the Long Sword dance of Yorkshire, as well as other sword dances in Europe.

The dance requires five performers who coordinate themselves while using "rapper swords" made from flexible steel. Accompanied by traditional folk music, the dancers wear hard-soled shoes that allow for percussive foot movements. Mental alertness, in addition to physical agility, is required in order for dance participants to use the swords effectively without causing harm to themselves or the other performers.

The dance involves five people, with many including characters such as Tommy and Betty, who announce the dance, engage the audience and most importantly, collect money from the onlookers. The performers are connected by short swords bearing two handles, with the handle on at least one end being fixed. The other handle is either fixed or swivelling, based on the preference of the rapper side. The flexible rapper swords form an unbroken chain connecting the dancers.

== History ==
Northumberland and County Durham.

Whilst substantial evidence for the origins of the rapper sword tradition does not exist, as of 2012, since the publication of Rapper: The Miner's Dance of North East England by Phil Heaton, it has been generally accepted that the dance was originally performed in the mining villages of the Northumberland and Durham coalfield in northeast England. The dances derive from a well-defined geographical area with an intensity of activity traced to pits along both the Durham and Northumberland banks of the river Tyne, south into County Durham past Sunderland and along the Northumberland coast.

The earliest definite account of hilt-and-point sword dancing in England dates back to an article in 1715 describing a dance in the Tyne Valley to the west of Newcastle upon Tyne. The dance described closely resembles long sword dances of Yorkshire. Later references to sword dancing in the northern counties include a dance described in 1787 in the Cumberland Packet newspaper of January 1788, and a description from Teesdale in 1778, referenced by William Hutchinson in his View of Northumberland.

At some stage in the nineteenth century, the rigid swords were replaced by flexible rappers. Very little is known about this major development in the tradition because of an absence of sufficient evidence, and it may have been entirely accidental. It used to thought that the flexible version was used for removing dirt from the backs of pit ponies, but there is no available documentation to verify this theory. It seems that two factors have influenced interpretations of when the rapper sword was introduced: firstly, the relocation of a steel works operation by Ambrose Crowley to the Derwent Valley, before which time it is believed that suitable steel for flexible swords would most likely have been unavailable; and secondly, the prohibitive expense of such instruments before the Bessemer process in 1855 that allowed steel to be made inexpensively.

Some of the earliest teams used hornpipes, rather than the jigs used in the modern era.

=== Nineteenth century ===
During the nineteenth century, teams of rapper dancers from the pit villages of Tyneside and Wearside would travel annually to the towns of Newcastle upon Tyne, Sunderland and Durham to perform the dance for the crowds, asking for monetary consideration. This was revived as a source of income during the miners' strikes and lay-offs, especially when the collieries were closed down over winter. Sword dancers of the North East were active in the political struggles of the coalfield. A team of Tyneside Rovers were part of a march on parliament in 1890.

=== Twentieth century ===
By the early twentieth century, the tradition was beginning to die out, but was revived by the interest generated after Cecil Sharp published notations for five of the traditional village dances in his book, The Sword Dances of Northern England. After the First World War, the revival was marked by the fierce competition between pit villages in the rapper classes of the newly instituted North of England Musical Tournament held annually in Newcastle upon Tyne. Teams were also reported all over Durham and Northumberland as dancing out and collecting in the 1926 miners' strike and later in the Great Depression. A team from Hebburn were part of the famous Jarrow Crusade in 1936.

After the Second World War, the tradition progressively declined in the original pit villages, partly as a result of social changes in the mining communities. However, another revival was initiated after the war, in 1949 by students at Kings College in Newcastle upon Tyne (now the University of Newcastle upon Tyne), which subsequently spread beyond the traditional area. Revival teams worldwide now perform the rapper tradition, sometimes learned from published notations, sometimes taught by rapper dancers in what is almost a continuation of the earlier oral traditions.

=== Twenty-first century ===
A rapper sword performance by Sligo Creek Sword in Maryland, U.S.

The dance has transformed as it moved into the twenty-first century: the pace has quickened and is performed at around 140–160 beats per minute, with different team styles using different rates. It is nonetheless typically performed in a smooth and graceful manner, with one figure flowing seamlessly into the next. A number of acrobatic figures can be employed, including forward and backward somersaults over the swords.

The dance is usually performed to jigs, with rapper stepping being a form of shuffle imported from the local clogging tradition. The jigs include local tunes and many instruments can, and have been, used to accompany rapper dances (the most popular being fiddles, tin whistles and accordions or melodeons). Many rapper jigs used for the last hundred years are tunes that were probably imported by Irish and Scottish immigrants to Tyneside in the nineteenth century. The music is usually performed solo, although it can be performed as a duet; however, rapper is not usually performed to a band. There is much controversy in the rapper community over the use of any form of percussion to accompany rapper beyond the rapper stepping included in the dance.

In modern times, the competitive element of rapper sword dancing has been revived in the form of the Dancing England Rapper Tournament (DERT) competition, and in recent years its American counterpart, Dancing America Rapper Tournament (DART).

Rapper sword dancing has also experienced renewed interest, and efforts to document and preserve the craft of sword making.

== Costume ==
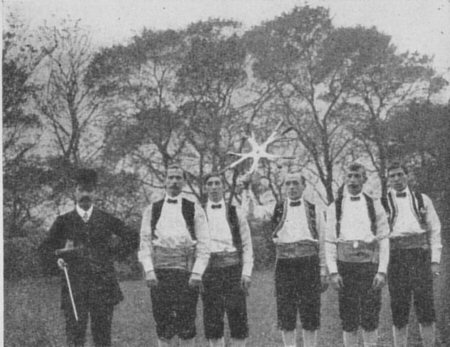
The Royal Earsdon sword dancers in 1910

The costume in which the dance is usually performed, referred to as the kit, is a stylised version of the working clothes of the local nineteenth century coal miner (see photograph). It consists of a shirt; sash; breeks (breeches), hoggers (similar to breeks but shorter), or long trousers; and socks or stockings. Some traditional teams decorated their kit with ribbons or rosettes, and added a tie and/or waistcoat.

Modern teams use a variety of kits, mostly based on the traditional costume, with each team using different combinations of colours to try to have a unique corporate image. Some other modern sides, especially women's sides, use very different kits.

== Performances ==
=== Dancing in pubs ===
Newcastle Kingsmen performing a rapper sword dance in a pub in Sidmouth, 2011

Unlike Cotswold Morris and other forms of traditional dance, Rapper Sword is often performed inside pubs, with 'rapper crawls', often on Friday nights, providing an opportunity for the general public (including those who have little interest in folk dance traditions) to see the dance being performed.

Performances in busy, noisy pubs in front of an audience which may not be familiar with the tradition provides an opportunity for the comic characters, the Tommy and Betty, to explain the dance and engage with the audience.

=== Dancing at folk festivals ===
Rapper sword teams also appear at folk festivals across the UK such as Sidmouth Folk Festival.

=== DERT competition ===
The DERT competition, which is open to all rapper sword teams, is held annually in a different UK city or town by a different Rapper side. The tournament initially comprised 3 divisions: Premier, Championship and Open, with a youth competition, 'DERTy', subsequently added. A further class, 'Traditional dance', was also introduced to highlight the original recorded dances and the style they were performed in.

Event	Location	Hosts	Dates	Overall winner	DERTy winner
DERT 2014	Leeds	Black Swan Rapper	7–9 March 2014	Star & Shadow	
DERT 2015	Bristol	Northgate Rapper	10–12 April 2015	Newcastle Kingsmen	NYFTE
DERT 2016	Manchester	Medlock Rapper	11–13 March 2016	Newcastle Kingsmen	Oakenyouth
DERT 2017	Kendal	Crook Morris	7–9 April 2017	Newcastle Kingsmen	NYFTE
DERT 2018	Sheffield	Sheffield Steel	23–25 March 2018	Whip the Cat	NYFTE
DERT 2019	Newcastle	Newcastle Kingsmen, Sallyport Sword & Star and Shadow Rapper	5–7 April 2019	Newcastle Kingsmen	-
DERT 2022	Derby	Stone Monkey	26 March 2022	Tower Ravens	-
DERT 2023	Rochdale	???	10-12 March 2023	Tower Ravens	NYFTE
DERT 2024	Whitby	???	12-14 April 2024	Black Swan Rapper	NYFTE
DERT 2025	Peterborough	Rockingham Rapper	4-6th April 2025	Sheffield Steel Rapper	Red Hat Rapper
DERT 2026	Birmingham	Birmingham Rapper	17-19th April 2026	Whip the Cat	NYFTE

In 2020, the competition was postponed due to COVID-19 pandemic in the United Kingdom. The DERT 2021 competition, due to be held in Edinburgh on 26–28 March 2021, was also cancelled due to COVID-19.

=== DART competition ===
The Dancing America Rapper Tournament (DART) is an American offshoot of DERT, happening annually on the East Coast of the United States since 2010. Featuring anywhere from 6 to 16 sides, DART is less focused on the competition side and more focused on building community among the still-growing rapper sword community in the United States.

== Rattle Up, My Boys ==
Rattle Up My Boys (RUMB) is a print journal for those with an interest in sword dance. Established in 1987 by founding editor Trevor Stone, it covers news, interviews, features, and reviews on rapper, Longsword, and other forms of European and world sword dance. The journal has clocked up over 130 editions. It is published quarterly in the UK and is available via subscription. The Morris Federation website hosts the Rattle Up, My Boys online archive. It contains scanned copies of every edition from 1987 to the present, with a rolling 2-year delay behind the current print edition.

== Further information ==
The Rapper Online website provides information on the origins and history of the dance, team profiles and notations of traditional dances. Current and historical information is also available at "The NUT on the Net", the Internet edition of "The NUT", the journal of the rapper sword dance.

Leading exponents of the tradition in its traditional area include the High Spen Blue Diamonds, the Newcastle Kingsmen, Monkseaton Morris Men, the Sallyport Sword Dancers and Star and Shadow. In addition to the Rapper Online website's list of rapper sword teams the Sword Dance Union has produced a map of current UK teams.

Rapper dancing has gained international popularity. Jack The Rapper, based in Norway, attended DERT in 1996, 1999 and 2003. The DERT 2005 and 2006 competitions were attended by four teams from the United States, named, Newhaven, Candyrapper (2005), Beside the Point (2006) and Scrambled Six (2007). Red Mum Rapper from Denmark competed in DERTs 2013, 2014, 2016 and 2018. The Pocket Flyers (USA) attended DERT 2015 in Bristol. Rapper teams also exist in Australia, Germany and the Basque Country of France.

== See also ==
- Earsdon Sword Dance

== Bibliography ==
- Heaton, Phil (2012). Rapper: The Miners' Sword Dance of North-East England. London: English Folk Dance and Song Society. ISBN 9780854182121.
