= Alfred Wall (composer) =

British violinist and composer

Alfred Michael Wall (29 September 1875 - 8 October 1936) was a British violinist and composer who was for a long time associated with the Newcastle Conservatoire.

== Career ==
Wall was born at 1 St Paul's Crescent, Camden in London, where his father William Wall was "a professor of music". In 1886, aged 11, he won a scholarship to study violin at the Royal College of Music. By the mid-1890s he had established himself as orchestral and chamber player in London and had begun composing. His String Quartet in G and the Violin Sonata in E were first performed in 1897 and 1898 at the Queen's Hall.

From the 1900s to the 1920s he was professor of violin at the Newcastle Conservatoire where he worked closely with Edgar Bainton and became friendly with William Gillies Whittaker. While there he was mostly associated with chamber music, becoming Director of the Municipal Chamber Concerts. He formed the Alfred Wall Quartet and played in the Bainton-Fuchs-Wall Trio with Bainton (piano) and cellist Carl Fuchs. He performed as a soloist and led (sometimes conducting) the Newcastle-on-Tyne Philharmonic Orchestra. As a soloist Wall played in the first broadcast performance of the Legende for violin and orchestra by Delius, on 5 November 1924. He was also one of the founders of the North of England Musical Tournament in 1919.

Towards the end of his life Wall made his home at Tirril Moor, Penrith. There he founded and led the Tirril Moor Quartette, which included his daughters Rosina (viola) and Dulcie (cello). He died at a nursing home in Carlisle following a relapse after an operation in October 1936.

His two daughters, Rosina Wall and Dulcie Salder (who married the Truro-based musical director Jean Salder, previously front man for The Serenaders and later director of the Cornwall Symphony Orchestra), both remained musically active, mostly in Cornwall. They founded the Linden Players, which later became the Newton Abbot Orchestra.

== Composer ==
Alfred Wall's compositions included the Quartet for Piano & Strings in C minor, composed in 1920 and first performed on 17 October 1922 at the Hall of the Art Workers' Guild, 6 Queen's Square, Bloomsbury in London by the McCullagh Quartet with Joseph Holbrooke as the pianist. It was published as part of the Carnegie Collection of British Music. The work, some 35 minutes in length, was recorded for the first time in 2022 by the Tippett Quartet with soloist Lynn Arnold.

The London premiere of his Thanet Overture took place at the BBC Proms, Queen's Hall, on 26 September 1922. It had been previously heard at the Bournemouth Easter Festival. His Idyll was performed by the Catterall Quartet in 1925 at concerts in Dublin and Manchester. There is also a Trio in Bb (1921), a Violin Sonata in A (1922), and four songs to texts by Israel Zangwill (1922).

Later works include Recreations, a five movement suite for strings "in the old style". It was published in 1925 and received its first broadcast the same year with several repeat performances over the next seven years. Pastorale and Bourree for string orchestra was published by Oxford University Press in 1927. The Three Intermezzi for string quartet (aka Three Sketches) were broadcast in 1932, performed by the Unity Quartet and published by OUP. The orchestral Cavatina and Caprice was broadcast by the BBC Dance Orchestra on 26 April 1935. A Ballade for viola and string orchestra was performed several times in 1934 and 1935 by soloist Lena Wood with the Birmingham Philharmonic String Orchestra, to whom the piece is dedicated, and again (posthumously) in Banbury in 1937.

In style, Alfred Wall's music (as described in the Radio Times) was "modern in outlook", but showing "no traces of extreme modern influences".

== List of works ==
- String Quartet in G (1897)
- Violin Sonata in E (1898)
- Violin Concerto (Newcastle Philharmonic, 1920)
- Quartet for piano and strings in C minor (Carnegie Award, 1920)
- Sonata in A for violin and piano (1921)
- Trio in Bb for violin, cello and piano (1921)
- Bagatelles for orchestra (1922)
- Four Songs (1922)
- Thanet Overture for orchestra (Bournemouth Music Festival, 1922)
- String Quartet (1922)
- Two Legends for orchestra (1923)
- Lucretius, tone poem for orchestra (Eastbourne Festival, 1923)
- Recreations, suite for strings (1925)
- Pastorale and Bourree for string orchestra (OUP, 1927)
- Three Sketches for string quartet (broadcast 1932)
- Ballade for viola and string orchestra (1934)
- Cavatina and Caprice for orchestra (broadcast 1935)
