= Lena Wood =

British violist (1899 - 1982)

- Born: Lena Wood; 4 October 1899; Croston, Lancashire, England
- Died: 23 September 1982 (aged 82) Stourbridge, Worcestershire, England
- Genre: Classical
- Occupation: Musician
- Instruments: Viola, Violin
- Formerly of: Birmingham Philharmonic String Orchestra, Birmingham Ladies' String Quartet

Lena Wood (4 October 1899 – 23 September 1982), was a British violist with the Birmingham Philharmonic String Orchestra and the Birmingham Ladies' String Quartet. She was a pupil of Lionel Tertis, performing and broadcasting with a number of ensembles from the 1920s to the 1950s.

== Biography ==
Lena Wood was born in Croston, near Chorley, Lancashire, the only surviving child of Colin Wood, a marine engineer and his wife Elizabeth. The family moved to Stourbridge in the early 1900s, where in 1930 Lena married Frank Clifford, but continued to use her family name of Wood. She was a pupil of the Dutch violinist Max Mossel at the Midland Institute and later a viola pupil of Lionel Tertis at the Royal Academy of Music in London, where she received her Licentiate of the Royal Academy of Music (LRAM) in December 1919.

She was a recitalist on the violin as well as the viola and performed with the tenor, Arthur Jordan in 1920. In 1921 she was the musical director of the cinema orchestra at The Olympia in Wordsley.

By the late 20s, Wood was performing on the radio. In 1928, in a Military Band Programme with the City of Birmingham Police Band, alongside the contralto Winifred Payne, she performed the Second Violin Suite by Franz Ries and Hungarian Rhapsody by Miska Hauser.

In December 1931, Wood was playing with the Alex Cohen Quartet when they gave the first broadcast performance of Walford Davies's Peter Pan Suite. The quartet were composed of Alex Cohen (1st Violin); Rowland Sirrell (2nd Violin); Lena Wood (Viola); Haydn York (Violoncello). In February 1932 the quartet gave the first broadcast performances of Riccardo Pick-Mangiagalli's Quartet in G minor Op.18 and Dvorak's Five Love Songs. In August 1932 the quartet gave the first English performance of Gian Francesco Malipiero's Cantari alla Madrigalesca. In December 1932 the quartet were joined by George Barrett on flute to broadcast the first performance in England of Jan Brandts Buys's Nativity Quintet.

In the 1930s Wood had her own radio slot on the Midland Programme when, for twenty to thirty minutes, she would play a violin or viola programme. In September 1932 she performed a violin recital composed of the Havanaise by Saint-Saens, Paganini's Perpetuum Mobile and Nándor Zsolt's Dragonflies. She would often include in these recitals new works by British composers such as William Alwyn and Alan Richardson.

In 1934 Wood gave the first performance of Alfred Wall's Ballade for Viola and String Orchestra with the Birmingham Philharmonic String Orchestra, in Birmingham. The piece was dedicated to the orchestra by the composer.

In May 1935 she performed with the Birmingham Philharmonic String Orchestra under Johan C. Hock at the Aeolian Hall in London. The Musical Times critic remarked on Wood's fine playing of the Ballade for Viola and String Orchestra and for her ensemble playing during the Introduction and Allegro by Elgar. Wall's Ballade was performed once more in Manchester on 10 December 1935.

In May 1935 Wood performed the Handel-Casadeus Viola Concerto with the Birmingham Philharmonic String Orchestra under Johan Hock.

In May 1936 on BBC Radio, the Birmingham Ladies' String Quartet, composed of Muriel Tookey, Dorothy Hemming, Lena Wood and Elsa Tookey, gave the first broadcast performances of William Alwyn's String Quartet No.10 En Voyage and his String Quartet No.12 Fantasia.

In February 1938 her performance of Bloch's Viola Suite on the radio came to the attention of the Musical Times critic W.R. Anderson, who described the piece as placing immense demands on the players, but describes Wood's and the pianist Doris Watkins' playing, as "well-attuned to the music's moods".

In 1939 Wood played the Elgar Cello Concerto, arranged for viola by Lionel Tertis, with the Birmingham Philharmonic Orchestra.

In April 1940 she played at the Wigmore Hall in London at a concert in aid of the ISM Benevolent Fund. Kathleen Cooper (piano), Audrey Caterall (violin), Lena Wood (viola) and Edith Lake (cello) played Faure's Quartet in C minor and the viola version of Brahms' Clarinet Trio.

In Birmingham in 1941, Wood gave the first performance of Ruth Gipps' Jane Grey (Fantasy) Op.15 for Viola and Piano.

In 1941 Wood, with the Catterall Quartet, Arthur Catterall (violin) Audrey Catterall (violin) and Johan C. Hock (cello) gave the first broadcast performance of Armstrong Gibbs's second quartet which he had dedicated to the quartet.

On 16 December 1942 she gave the first broadcast performance of Elizabeth Maconchy's Viola Sonata with Tom Bromley (piano) on the BBC's Latin American Service.

In 1954 she gave the first performance of Christopher Edmunds' (Note: Dr Christopher Edmunds, 1899-1990, composer, lived and worked in Birmingham all his life. Edmunds was a teacher of harmony and composition at the Birmingham School of Music from 1929 and Principal, 1945-1956) Sonata for Viola, with Tom Bromley (piano) at The Midland Institute. Also performed at this recital was Joseph Gibbs' D minor Sonata, at which the Musical Times critic noted that: "Miss Wood played it admirably."

Lena Wood played with a number of ensembles during her performing career including the Birmingham Quartet, the Midlands Wireless Orchestra, the Alex Cohen Quartet, the London Pianoforte Quartet, the Ionian String Quartet, the Catterall String Quartet, Johan Hoch's Chamber Orchestra and the Clifford Quintet which she founded.

Wood taught at the Royal Birmingham Conservatoire and was a formidable teacher. Her pupil Howard Breakspear, principal viola of Opera North, referred to her as "The Dragon", stating she was, "as terrifying as she was inspirational".

She died aged 82 in Stourbridge at her home ‘Claremont’, 66 Worcester Street, where she had lived for over fifty years.

Her name is remembered in the Musicians’ Book of Remembrance in the Musician's Chapel within the Church of the Holy Sepulchre, (The Musicians’ Church) in London.
