= George Clinton (clarinettist) =

British clarinettist

- Born: 16 December 1850; Newcastle upon Tyne
- Died: 24 October 1913 (aged 62) London
- Occupations: Professor, performer
- Instrument: Clarinet

George Arthur Clinton (1850–1913) was a British clarinettist. He was a member of Queen Victoria's private ensemble beginning at age 17. He was the principal clarinettist for the Philharmonic Society and The Crystal Palace, and taught at the Royal Academy of Music and several universities. In the early years of the 20th century he was clarinet professor at the Royal Military School of Music, Kneller Hall, in Twickenham.

His family included several notable clarinettists. His father Arthur was a bandleader and clarinettist. His brother James created a 13-key "combination" clarinet in 1892; its extensible head joint enabled the instrument to transpose from A to B-flat and vice versa. George Clinton also worked on developing clarinet mechanisms. "The Clinton system", introduced around 1885, continued to be popular into the mid-20th century.

Clinton organised a series of chamber music concerts at Steinway Hall. He popularised the Weber, Spohr and Mozart concertos in England, and performed the Brahms Quintet in May 1892, only shortly after it was first published in Britain. He performed Richard Walthew's Trio (clarinet, violin and piano), and The Song of Love and Death (clarinet and soprano), in 1898. He also performed William Hurlstone's Clarinet Sonata, a piece which is now missing. Hurlstone dedicated his Four Characteristic Pieces of 1899 to Clinton, and it's possible that this work is the Sonata renamed.

His pupils included the composer Sam Hartley Braithwaite.
