= William G. Whittaker =

English composer, 1876-1944

William Gillies Whittaker
- Born: 23 July 1876; Newcastle upon Tyne
- Died: 5 July 1944 (aged 68); Orkney Islands

William Gillies Whittaker (Newcastle upon Tyne, July 23, 1876 – Orkney Islands, July 5, 1944) was an English composer, pedagogue, conductor, musicologist, Bach scholar, publisher and writer. He spent his life promoting music. The University of Durham, where he once studied and taught, called him one of "Britain's most influential musicians during the first half of the twentieth century". An autodidact, he was a prodigious creator of Gebrauchsmusik.

== Early life and education in Newcastle ==
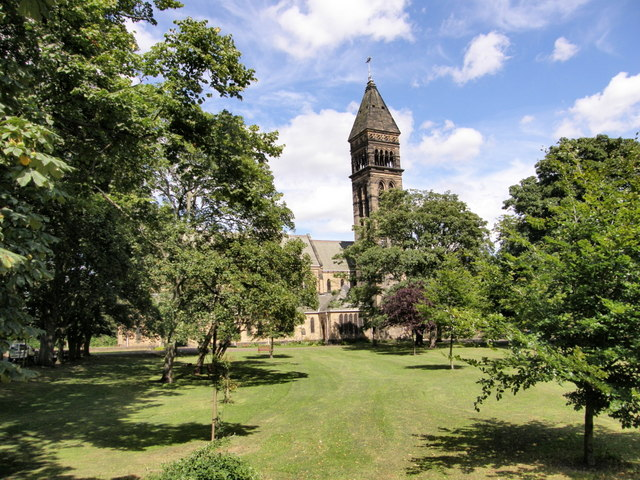
St George's Church and Green in Jesmond, where Whittaker played the organ as a schoolboy

Whittaker was born into a Methodist family in the Shieldfield district of Newcastle upon Tyne. His father, John Whittaker, the illegitimate son of a farm labourer's daughter, came from Little Corby in Cumberland. His mother, Ellen Gillies, was an orphan from a respected family in Hexham in Northumberland. From an early age Whittaker showed an interest in music: he learnt to play the flute and his father bought him a piccolo; and he played as a schoolboy organist at St George's Church in Jesmond. His father encouraged him to follow a career in science, which led to Whittaker initially studying mathematics—without great success—at Armstrong College, at that time part of the University of Durham (it later formed the nucleus of the present-day University of Newcastle upon Tyne). Subsequently, he resumed organ and singing lessons, obtaining performing and teaching qualifications from the Associated Board of the Royal Schools of Music; and, from 1898, he commenced studies in musicology at the University of Durham.

After graduating he continued at Armstrong College; he had successive appointments as instructor, lecturer and reader in music; and he embarked on a doctorate in 1902, submitting a dissertation in 1909, although he had to wait until 1921 for the degree to be awarded. He also worked as a music master at two of the main girls' schools in Newcastle, teaching singing at the Central Newcastle High School in Jesmond and Rutherford Girls' School at Rye Hill (which opened in 1907 in former buildings of the Royal Grammar School). In 1903 Whittaker married Clara Watkins, an amateur musician from Gateshead and the daughter of a South Shields ship owner. Together they had two daughters, Clarrie and Mary, brought up as strict vegetarians with an equally strict regime of pre-breakfast instrumental practice on the cello and the violin.

== Choir work on Tyneside ==
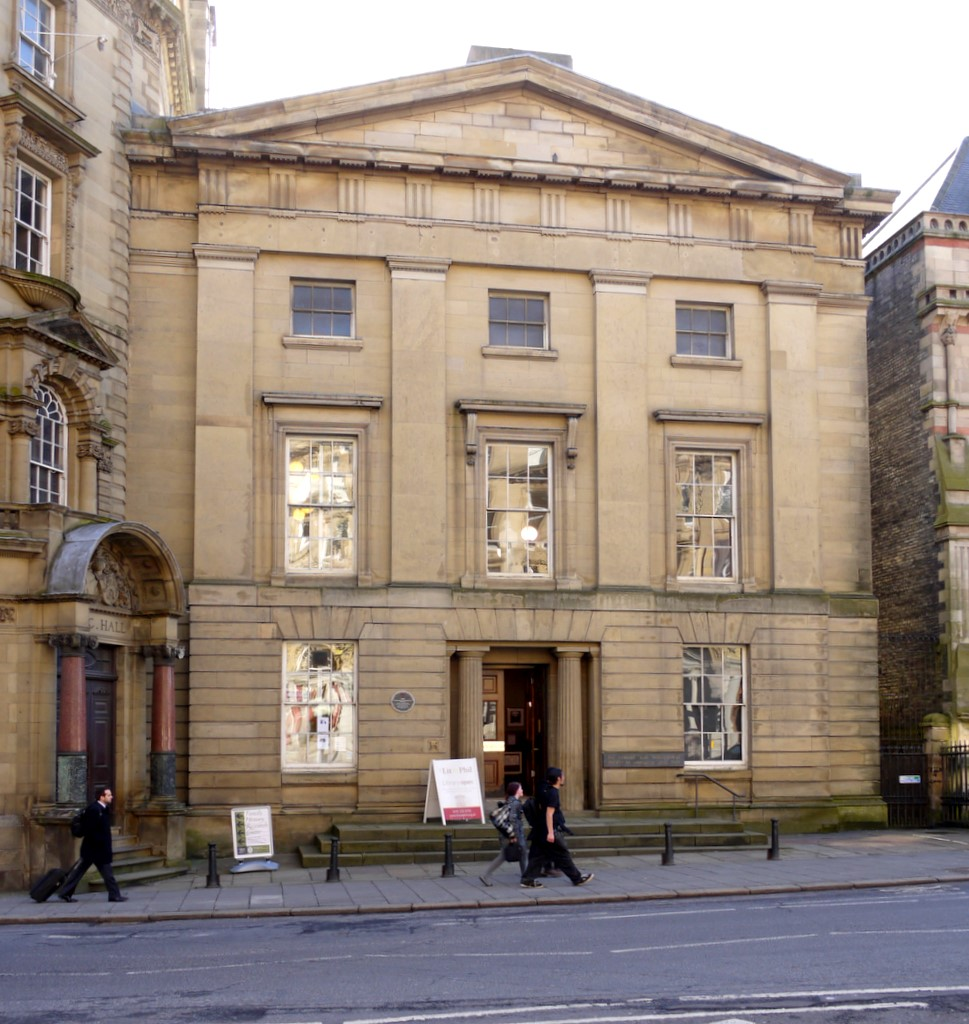
The Literary and Philosophical Society in the centre of Newcastle, where Whittaker frequently attended and gave lectures

Whittaker conducted several choirs on Tyneside, working with the Newcastle Choral Union, Newcastle Bach Choir, the Whitley Bay Choral Society, the Tynemouth Choral Society and the Gateshead Choral Union. With these ensembles, he achieved excellent results. He also knew many composers of the period, with Gustav Holst amongst his friends; and he met Maurice Ravel on a visit to Newcastle, during which Ravel accompanied his newly composed song cycle Histoires Naturelles and attended a rehearsal of his own string quartet. He was friendly with Edgar Bainton (who arrived in Newcastle in 1901) and Alfred Wall. Whittaker's mentor Charles Sanford Terry, who was at the University of Durham before taking up a post at the University of Aberdeen, encouraged Whittaker's enthusiasm for J.S. Bach, particularly his choral music. Whittaker performed all of Bach's cantatas during his career.

He founded the Newcastle Bach Choir in 1915, based in Newcastle Cathedral. One of the members of the choir, Basil Bunting, recalled that he was "not only learned but also showed [a] great sense of music and art in general". With the Newcastle Bach Choir, he made a concert tour to London and participated in a three-day festival in 1922. He performed the first complete version of the Great English Service of William Byrd in Newcastle upon Tyne, and performed it again at St. Margaret's Church in Westminster in 1924. From 1925 onwards he served on three musical advisory committees of the BBC.

== Appointment in Glasgow ==
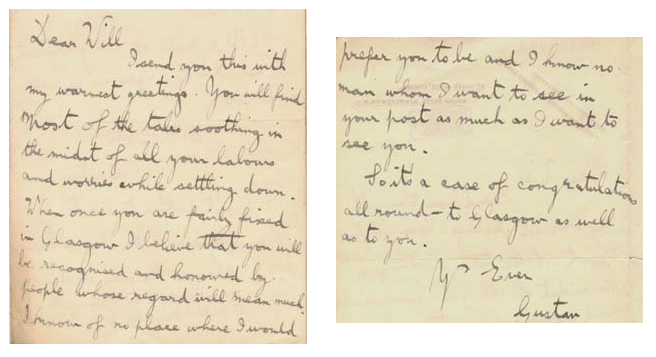
Letter of congratulations from Gustav Holst on Whittaker's appointment in Glasgow

In 1929, finding musical opportunities in the North East of England too restrictive, Whittaker moved to Glasgow, where he took up a newly endowed joint position as Principal of the Scottish National Academy of Music (RSAMD) (1929–1941) and Gardiner Professor of Music at the University of Glasgow (1929–1941). In making the move, Whittaker left his wife Clara, who subsequently moved to London to join their daughter Mary. Whittaker himself was accompanied North of the border by his former student Annie Lawton, with whom he set up house. Once installed in Scotland, he received an honorary degree from the University of Glasgow and an honorary doctorate from the University of Edinburgh, where his friend Donald Tovey was professor of music.

Tovey, a member of the governing board of the Academy, wrote to Whittaker that he hoped the award might be "of some slight value for strengthening your hand for a task that you cannot execute without overcoming some opposition." The task was to transform what had previously been the Athenaeum School into a musical academy similar to the colleges in London; but despite, grants from the local benefactor Daniel Macaulay Stevenson, there were insufficient funds to finance musical scholarships, attract teachers, build up a library and hold concerts. Whittaker was disappointed by musical life in Glasgow, which he later stated to be "even more provincial" than in Newcastle. He was frustrated that his attempts to improve matters were constantly opposed by governors during his tenure as Principal: it was "a heart-breaking struggle against impossible odds."

== Legacy in Glasgow ==
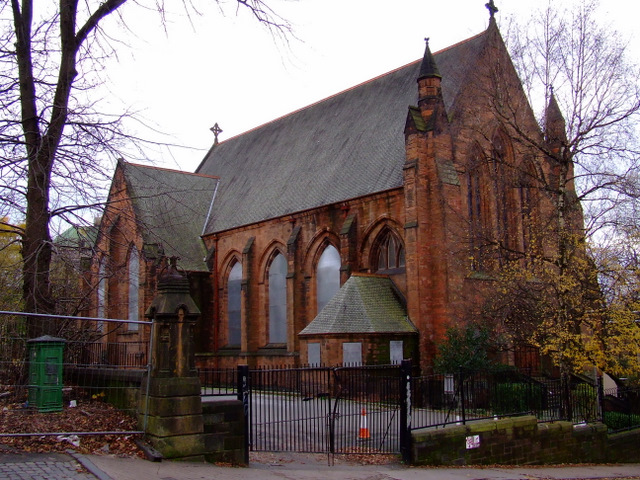
Former Belmont Parish Church, Great George Street, Hillhead, where Whittaker conducted the last concert of the Bach Cantata Choir in Byrd's Great Service and Bach's Motet "Sing ye to the Lord" on 29 March 1941

Despite the difficulties he encountered, Whittaker nevertheless found a kindred spirit and friend in the main professor of pianoforte Philip Halstead, whom he described as a "splendid all-round musician"; and was given unpaid support by Harold Thomson, a former student at the Academy who became a close friend. Assisted by them and others, he succeeded in setting up a three-year Diploma course. Somewhat unexpectedly he also discovered that the local Glasgow Bach Choir had performed very few of Bach's cantatas; they willingly agreed to become part of Whittaker's new Bach Cantata Choir which performed in Stevenson Hall, the newly built concert hall of the Academy. As a result, Whittaker was able to realise his lifelong ambition of performing all of Bach's cantatas: he performed one third of them in Newcastle and the remaining two thirds in Glasgow. He later described his activities with the Bach Cantata Choir as the "chief joy" of his period in Glasgow.

Other activities in the concert hall included "Opera Week" for operas, oratorios and incidental music, including works of Purcell, Handel, Bach, Gluck, Mozart and Schubert; some governors of the Academy attempted unsuccessfully to have these performances stopped as "profligate", their preference being for Gilbert and Sullivan and Offenbach. Whittaker succeeded in raising funds from the Carnegie Foundation for a library, now the Whittaker Library in the Royal Conservatoire of Scotland; and also set up a museum of ancient instruments in the Academy and an archive of musical manuscripts, now the Whittaker Collection, in the university.

== Retirement and death ==
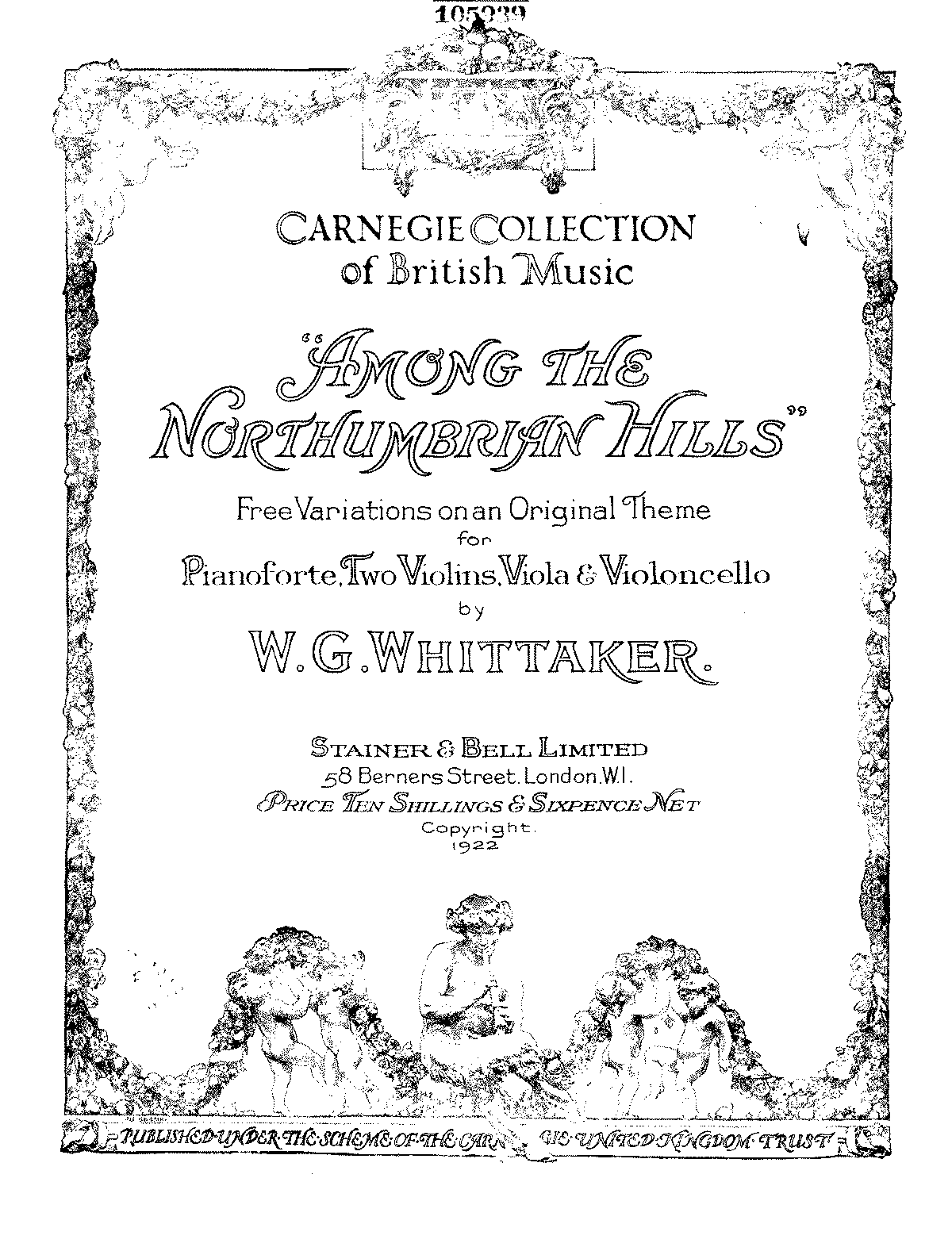
Among the Northumbrian Hills, title page, 1922

Whittaker had briefly resigned from the Academy in 1938, when, on returning from a trip to Sweden, he discovered that the governors had reversed some of his decisions during his absence. When it transpired that the Academy could not run smoothly without him, he acceded to a request from the Vice Chancellor of the University to return to his post. On his retirement in 1941, he was made an emeritus professor in the university. Despite ill health, he agreed to join ENSA, under the leadership of Walter Legge and Basil Dean, to help in the running of wartime classical music events. This involved giving lectures around the country, organising concerts, adjudicating competitions and preparing boxes of records for concerts.

On a trip to act as judge at a Services Festival in the Orkney Islands in July 1944, he died of heart failure in his sleep. In his will he bequeathed a copy of a bronze sculpture that Jacob Epstein had made of him in 1942 to King's College in Newcastle.

== Publications ==
Whittaker's main expertise as performer and scholar lay in the cantatas of J.S.Bach. Whittaker's book on the subject was published posthumously by Oxford University Press in 1959 in two volumes, which Harold Thompson prepared for publication from a typed draft. In a later edition of 1978 an appendix was added to correct chronological details which only became known in the 1950s. Whittaker also promoted musicians like Gustav Holst, Vaughan Williams, Debussy, Satie, and Poulenc. In addition to Bach scholarship, he acted as a publisher and editor of music from the 17th and 18th centuries. Among his works are A Lyke-Wake Dirge for chorus and orchestra (1925), and Among the Northumbrian Hills, free variations on an original theme for piano and string quartet (1922), both of which were published as part of the Carnegie Collection of British Music.

Other works include The Celestial Sphere for chorus and orchestra, and Psalm CXXXIX. He also had a strong interest in folk music from his native Tyneside and Northumberland, championing the Northumbrian smallpipes; he published arrangements of folk songs, including choral versions of the "Keel Row", "Bobby Shaftoe", "Blow the Wind Southerly" and "Waters of Tyne".
