= Edgar Bainton =

Composer (1880-1956)

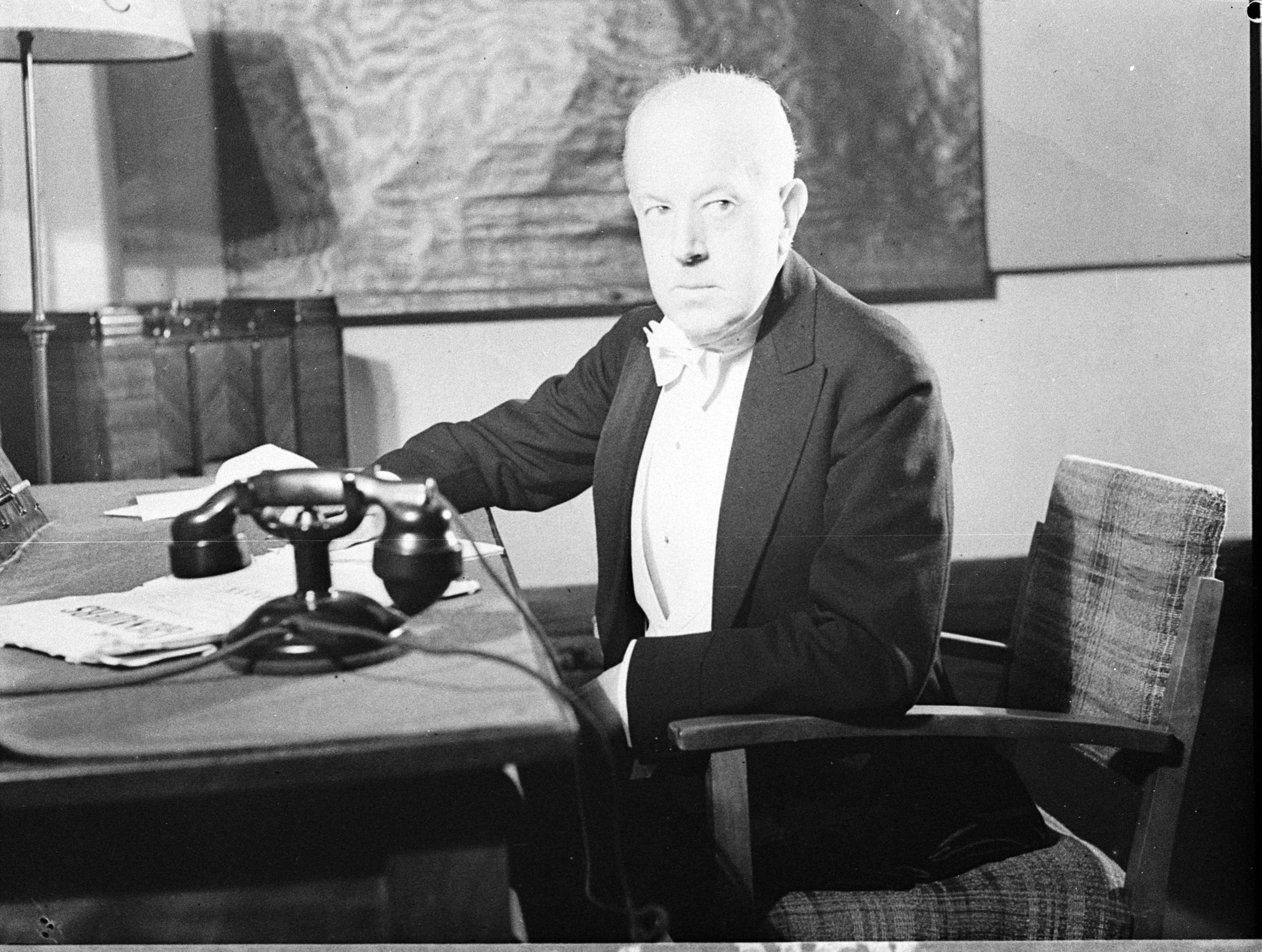
- Edgar Bainton in 1936.
- Born: Edgar Leslie Bainton; 14 February 1880; Hackney, Middlesex, England
- Died: 8 December 1956 (aged 76); Point Piper, Sydney, New South Wales, Australia
- Occupation: Composer
- Years active: 1898–1956
- Notable work: And I saw a new heaven
- Spouse: Ethel Eales (m. 1905–1956)
- Children: 2

Edgar Leslie Bainton (14 February 1880 – 8 December 1956) was a British-born, latterly Australian-resident composer. He is remembered today mainly for his liturgical anthem And I saw a new heaven, a popular work in the repertoire of Anglican church music, but during recent years Bainton's other musical works, neglected for decades, have been increasingly available in commercial recordings.

== Early life and career ==
Bainton was born in Hackney, London, the son of George Bainton, a Congregational minister, and his wife, Mary, née Cave. Bainton later moved with his family to Coventry and he showed early signs of musical ability playing the piano; he was nine years old when he made his first public appearance as solo pianist. He was awarded a music scholarship to King Henry VIII Grammar School in Coventry in 1891, and in 1896 he won an open scholarship to the Royal College of Music to study theory with Walford Davies. In 1899 he received a scholarship to study composition with Sir Charles Villiers Stanford. At college he became friends with George Dyson, William Harris and especially Rutland Boughton, whose friendship and support continued throughout Bainton's career. Bainton kept a notebook listing nearly all his compositions, the first entry being his first known surviving work, Prelude and Fugue in B minor for piano, written in 1898.

In 1901 Bainton became piano professor at the Newcastle upon Tyne Conservatory of Music. He became involved in the local musical scene, composing, playing and conducting and in 1905, he married a former student, Ethel Eales, with whom he had two daughters. Ethel was an excellent pianist and singer, and a founder member of the Newcastle Bach Choir He became the Principal of the Conservatory in 1912, and acquired property for its expansion. Alfred Wall was on the staff there, and Bainton also became friendly with William Gillies Whittaker. The family lived at Stocksfield, near Hexham. Bainton would take long country walks, frequently accompanied by Wilfred Gibson, who introduced Bainton into the literary circle surrounding Gordon Bottomley. Bainton set many of Bottomley's poems and wrote an opera to one of his lyric dramas. He introduced his local area to previously unknown works by Gustav Holst, Ralph Vaughan Williams and Arnold Bax, among others. He developed friendships with poet Elliott Dodds and cathedral organist William Ellis.

== Prisoner of war and freedom ==
In the summer of 1914 Bainton visited Germany to attend the Bayreuth Festival, but was arrested after war broke out. As a male enemy alien of military age he was sent to the civilian detention camp at Ruhleben, near Berlin, where he remained for the next four years. Bainton was put in charge of all the music at the camp and became acquainted with Ernest MacMillan, Edward Clark and Arthur Benjamin, among other later successful musicians. He maintained many of these friendships throughout his career. In March 1918 his health deteriorated and he was sent to The Hague to recuperate. Following the Armistice, he became the first Englishman to conduct the Concertgebouw Orchestra, in two concerts of British music before returning to England.

Bainton's life returned to normal and he returned to Newcastle to resume work at the Conservatory (which his wife Ethel had taken charge of in his absence). His choral works became features of the Three Choirs Festivals. Touring Australia and Canada from April 1930 to January 1931, he took a break from composing, and from August to December 1932 he visited India, giving a piano recital for the Indian Broadcasting Company. The poet and musician Rabindranath Tagore made him a guest in Calcutta and introduced him to Indian music. In 1933, Sir Edward Bairstow awarded him an honorary Doctor of Music at Durham University.

== Australia ==
The New South Wales State Conservatorium of Music was impressed by his display of skills in 1930, and offered him the directorship in the summer of 1933. Accordingly, in 1934 Bainton and his family started a new life in Australia.

Bainton conducted the choral and orchestral classes at the Conservatorium, and founded the Sydney Opera School. At the Conservatorium he taught Australian composers including Miriam Hyde. Expatriate Australian composer Vincent Plush (b. 1950) writes that when Arnold Schoenberg applied for the position of teacher of harmony and theory at the Sydney Conservatorium in 1934, Bainton turned down the application on the grounds of "modernist ideas and dangerous tendencies." An anonymous colleague of Bainton's allegedly remarked that Schoenberg was Jewish.

Coinciding with Bainton's arrival in Sydney were moves to form a permanent professional orchestra for the Australian Broadcasting Commission, which occasionally went under the name of the New South Wales Symphony Orchestra. It was later renamed the Sydney Symphony Orchestra. Bainton conducted that ensemble's inaugural concert in 1934.

He introduced music previously unheard in Australia, such as Elgar's Symphony No. 2 in 1934; Bax's Third Symphony; and works by Debussy, Sibelius, Delius, and Walton, among others. In 1944, the premiere production by the Conservatorium Opera School of Bainton's opera The Pearl Tree received acclaim from the press and public alike. An additional night's performance was given due to demand, and on this latter occasion a bust of Bainton was unveiled in the foyer.

Australia then had a mandatory retirement age of 65, but Bainton continued to conduct (temporarily with the New Zealand Symphony Orchestra), and gave lecture tours in Canada. In 1956, a heart attack severely affected his health, and on 8 December he died at Point Piper in Sydney. His wife had predeceased him by only a few months.

== Recordings ==
- And I saw a new heaven, anthem: The Sixteen/Harry Christophers, Universal 1795732 (2009)
- Cello Sonata: Emma Ferrand, Jeremy Young, Meridian CDE 84565 (2008)
- Christ In the Wilderness, Night, Open Thy Gates: City Chamber Choir of London/Stephen Jones, British Music Society BMS 417CD (2010)
- Epithalamion, An English Idyll: BBC Philharmonic/Martyn Brabbins, Chandos CHAN 10019 (2003)
- Genesis (1st mvt. of Symphony No. 1 Before Sunrise): Classico CLASSCD 404 (2002)
- Miniature Suite for piano duo: Divine Art DDV 24154 (2012)
- Paracelsus, Pompilia, Prometheus, tone poems: Dutton CDLX 7262 (2011)
- Songs: Susan Bickley, Christopher Gillett, Wendy Hiscocks, Naxos 8571377 (2017)
- String Quartet in A major: Lochrian Ensemble, Dutton CDLX 7163 (2006)
- Symphony No. 2: BBC Philharmonic Orchestra/Vernon Handley, Chandos CHAN 9757 (2000)
- Symphony No. 3: Sydney Symphony Orchestra/Sir Bernard Heinze, Brolga LP BZM12 (1957)
- Symphony No. 3: BBC Concert Orchestra/Vernon Handley, Dutton CDLX7185 (2007)
- Viola Sonata: Martin Outram, Michael Jones, British Music Society BMS CD 415R (2004)

== Musical works ==
=== Chamber music ===
- Quintet for Piano and Strings, Op. 9 (1904) (Lost)
- String Quartet, Op. 26 (1911) (Lost)
- String Quartet in A major (1919)
- Sonata for Viola and Piano (1922)
- Sonata for Cello and Piano (1924)

=== Chorus and orchestra ===
- The Blessed Damozel (lyrics by Dante Gabriel Rossetti), Op. 11 (with mezzo-soprano and baritone soloists). (Revived by the Broadheath Singers, Eton in 1999)
- Sunset at Sea, Op. 20 (lyrics by Reginald Buckley), for chorus and orchestra
- The Vindictive Staircase, Op. 29 (lyrics by W. W. Gibson), a Humoreske for chorus and orchestra
- A Song of Freedom and Joy (lyrics by Edward Carpenter), Op. 24 for chorus and orchestra
- The Tower (lyrics by Robert Nichols), for chorus and orchestra
- The Dancing Seal (lyrics by W.W.Gibson), a Humoreske for chorus and orchestra
- A Hymn to God the Father (lyrics by John Donne), for chorus and orchestra
- Mignon's Requiem (lyrics by Goethe and Carlyle), for boys' voices, chorus and orchestra
- The Transfiguration of Dante, Op. 18, for soloists, chorus and orchestra
- To The Name above every name, (lyrics by Richard Crashaw), for soprano, chorus and orchestra

=== Church music ===
- And I Saw a New Heaven
- Fantasia on the plainsong melody Vexilla Regis
- Fiat Lux for "4-part chorus S.A.T.B."
- Who can number the Sands of the Sea? for "S.A.T.B."
- Open Thy Gates
- Christ in the Wilderness
- The Heavens Declare Thy Glory
- A Babe is Born I Wys

=== Piano ===
- Variations and Fugue in B minor, op.1 (1898)
- The Making of the Nightingale (1921)
- Gardens of the Sea (1924)
- Willows (1927)

=== Songs and part songs ===
- Two Songs for Baritone and Orchestra, Op. 13 (Lyrics: Edward Carpenter)
- An English Idyll (Lyrics: Neville Cardus) for Baritone and Orchestra.
- Sweet Nightingale – English folk song, arranged Bainton
- Music for a Tragedy
- Music for film; 'Bush Policemen'
- Four Dances: Morris Dance, Minuet, Pavane, Valse, Op. 21
- Celtic Sketches: Sea-Sorrow, Sea Rapture, Pharais, Op.23

=== Symphonies and orchestral works ===
- Symphony No. 1 Before Sunrise for Contralto Solo, Chorus and Orchestra
- Symphony No. 2 in D minor
- Symphony No. 3 in C minor
- Symphony in B-flat A Phantasy of Life and Progress, Op. 5 (Lost)
- Symphonic Poem: Pomplia
- Symphonic Poem: Paracelsus (after Browning), Op. 8
- Suite: The Golden River, Op. 16
- Overture-Phantasy: Prometheus, Op. 19
- Three Pieces for Orchestra: Elegy, Intermezzo and Humoresque.
- Concerto Fantasia for Piano and Orchestra
- Pavane, Idyll and Bacchanal for Strings
- Rhapsody: Epithalamion
- Eclogue for Orchestra
