= Dancing England Rapper Tournament =

The Dancing England Rapper Tournament (DERT) is a continuation of the most significant rapper sword dance competitions that were held in Newcastle upon Tyne, England, the centre of the coalfields where the dance originated. The modern annual weekend event, held at different venues in the UK, brings together rapper teams and sword dancers from around the country and occasionally abroad.

While the element of competition is important, the social aspects are just as fierce. The essential idea behind the tournament was then and is now that teams have to practise well and develop their skills.

== Background ==
The Newcastle Tournament of Music and Art, which included a Traditional Short Sword or Rapper competition for seniors and juniors, was held annually in the City Hall and other prestigious venues around the city. This event was known later as the North of England Musical Tournament which began in 1919. One of its founders was the Newcastle composer and violinist Alfred M Wall. The event continued under that name until the early 1950s.

The event consisted of many musical and performance classes held over most of a week, but it was the Saturday Rapper competition that drew the most crowds. Judges were imported from the newly formed, London-based, English Folk Dance Society, founded and directed by folk song and dance collector Cecil Sharp.

The pit villages where the dance was "invented" were known for their tight knit communities and fierce independence, and they sent their best teams along. The City Hall was packed and the press were ready to lionise the winners. First the Juniors, then a few women's and girls' teams and then finally the men competed for the Cowen Trophy, medals and glory.

In the early days, papers such as the Evening Chronicle and the Northern Echo had banner headlines of the results, giving fame and pride to the village of the trophy winners. Whichever team won was copied. Stepping patterns, new tunes, and figures and movements were stolen or borrowed. Rivalry was high with reported fights backstage and around town.

== The modern DERT competition ==
The modern DERT competition has its origins in an event which took place during the Dancing England event of traditional English dancing which was held in the Assembly Rooms in Derby between 1979 and 1987. A rapper competition known as the Dancing England Rapper Tournament (DERT) took place on the afternoon prior to the evening performance.

Following the demise of Dancing England, the rapper sword competition continued under the name "DERT".

The competition travels around the country and is organised by a different rapper team every year with support provided by previous DERT organisers, the wider rapper community and the Sword Dance Union. In most years it is an international competition, with past entries from teams from the UK, United States, China, Denmark, Canada and Norway. Between 25 and 30 teams compete for prizes, accolades and bragging rights for the following year. Entries are divided into three divisions: Premier, Championship and Open, with potential promotions and demotions occurring depending on how the teams dance. Musicians compete for the Angela Lee Trophy. The Tommy and Betty characters employed by most of the sword dance teams are also subject to the judges' scrutiny.

The competition takes place in pubs in the host city, with teams dancing in front of two judges. The judges are tasked with grading the teams on their sword handling skills, teamwork, stepping and creation of 'buzz factor'. There is also a Spotlight dance in front of four judges in a quieter environment where accuracy and teamwork become very important. There is a Traditional competition, where teams must perform a traditional dance as notated in three defined publications. Veteran dancers are encouraged to compete for the Adrienne Moss Trophy, a carved wooden sculpture of walking sticks.

The future of DERT and rapper sword dancing is also catered for, with a competition called DERTy. This section is divided into Youth and Junior sections with dancers practising and then performing in front of a judging panel.

DERT finishes with a showcase event where all teams dance on stage in front of each other, and the various prizes and awards are given. The overall winner of DERT receives the Steve Marris Trophy, which recognises the massive contribution made by Marris to the rapper sword community. For many years he was the UK's only manufacturer of rapper swords; without him, rapper sword dancing as a traditional dance form would have been in very serious danger of dying out. Until recently, there were two rapper and longsword manufacturers keeping the tradition alive, Frank Lee in Brampton, Cumbria, and Jimmie Killner in Hampshire, who has sadly now passed away.

== Other rapper competitions ==
=== North East Rapper Championship ===
The North East Rapper Championship was devised by folklorist Peter Kennedy when he worked for the EFDSS in Newcastle. It was meant to revive the flagging competitions of the dying Newcastle Tournament. It had its first event in Hexham in 1949, where Royal Earsdon were the winners. Over the next few years it was held in various places in the North East. Royal Earsdon were invariably the winners until the competition ceased in 1956.

This competition has also had a revival, and in 2011, the Sallyport Sword Dancers won a new Trophy in Washington, Co. Durham. Other winners have been High Spen, Newcastle Kingsmen and Star and Shadow. Venues have been Hexham, and the Sage and St Mary's in Gateshead. In January 2018, the NE Championship with an extra Traditional class was held in the Cumberland Arms, Byker, in Newcastle. In 2019 it took place in Earsdon village and 2020 at The Old Coal Yard brewery in Byker. It did not take place in 2021, 2022, 2023 or 2024.

=== Dancing America Rapper Tournament ===
The Dancing America Rapper Tournament (DART) is an American offshoot of DERT, that has taken place annually in the United States and Canada since 2010. The 2020, 2021, and 2022 competitions did not take place due to the Coronavirus pandemic. Featuring anywhere from 6 to 16 sides, DART is less focused on the competition side and more focused on building community among the still-growing rapper sword community in the United States.

== Winners ==
The most recent DERT competitions took place in Peterborough in 2025, Whitby in 2024, Rochdale in 2023, and Derby in 2022. The 2021 event was to have been in Edinburgh, hosted by Mons Meg, but was cancelled due to the Coronavirus pandemic. The 2020 event in Lincoln (to be hosted by Whip the Cat) was cancelled for the same reason.

Details of the locations and dates of recent DERT competitions are given below.

Event	Location	Dates	Overall winner	DERTy winner
DERT 2026	Birmingham	17 - 19 April 2026	Whip the Cat	NYFTE
DERT 2025	Peterborough	4 - 6 April 2025	Sheffield Steel Rapper	Red Hat Rapper
DERT 2024	Whitby	12 - 14 April 2024	Black Swan	NYFTE
DERT 2023	Rochdale	10 - 12 March 2023	Tower Ravens	NYFTE
DERT 2022	Derby	26 March 2022	Tower Ravens	-
DERT 2021	Edinburgh	Cancelled due to Coronavirus	N/A	N/A
DERT 2020	Lincoln	Cancelled due to Coronavirus	N/A	N/A
DERT 2019	Newcastle	5 - 7 April 2019	Newcastle Kingsmen	Horizon College
DERT 2018	Sheffield	23 - 25 March 2018	Whip the Cat	NYFTE
DERT 2017	Kendal	7 - 9 April 2017	Newcastle Kingsmen	NYFTE
DERT 2016	Manchester	11 - 13 March 2016	Newcastle Kingsmen	Oakenyouth
DERT 2015	Bristol	10 - 12 April 2015	Newcastle Kingsmen	NYFTE
DERT 2014	Leeds	7 - 9 March 2014	Star & Shadow	
DERT 2013	Burton-on-Trent	8 - 10 March 2013	Star & Shadow	
DERT 2012	London	30 March - 1 April 2012	Newcastle Kingsmen	
DERT 2011	Oxford	4 – 6 March 2011	Sallyport Sword Dancers	
DERT 2010	Derby	9 – 11 April 2010	Newcastle Kingsmen	
DERT 2009	Newcastle	13 – 15 March 2009	Newcastle Kingsmen	
DERT 2008	Liverpool	7 - 9 March 2008	Newcastle Kingsmen	
DERT 2007	Nottingham	10 – 11 March 2007	Newcastle Kingsmen	
DERT 2006	York	17 – 19 March 2006	Sallyport Sword Dancers	
DERT 2005	Preston	4 – 6 March 2005	Maltby Phoenix	
DERT 2004	Bath	26 – 28 March 2004	Black Swan	
DERT 2003	Glasgow	4 – 6 April 2003	Black Swan	
DERT 2002	Sheffield	12 – 16 April 2002	Black Swan	
DERT 2001	Masham	2 – 4 March 2001	Sallyport Sword Dancers	
DERT 2000	Greenwich	4 – 6 March 2000	Sallyport Sword Dancers	
DERT 1999	Newcastle upon Tyne	5 – 7 March 1999	Newcastle Kingsmen	
DERT 1998	Ryton, Gateshead	20 - 22 February 1998	Stone Monkey	
DERT 1997				
DERT 1996	Burton on Trent		Stone Monkey	
DERT 1995	Leytonstone, London		Sallyport Sword Dancers	
DERT 1994	Newcastle upon Tyne		Stone Monkey	
