= Carnegie United Kingdom Trust =

UK charitable foundation

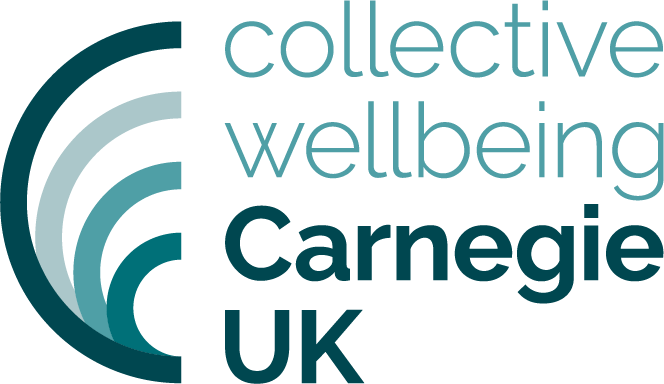

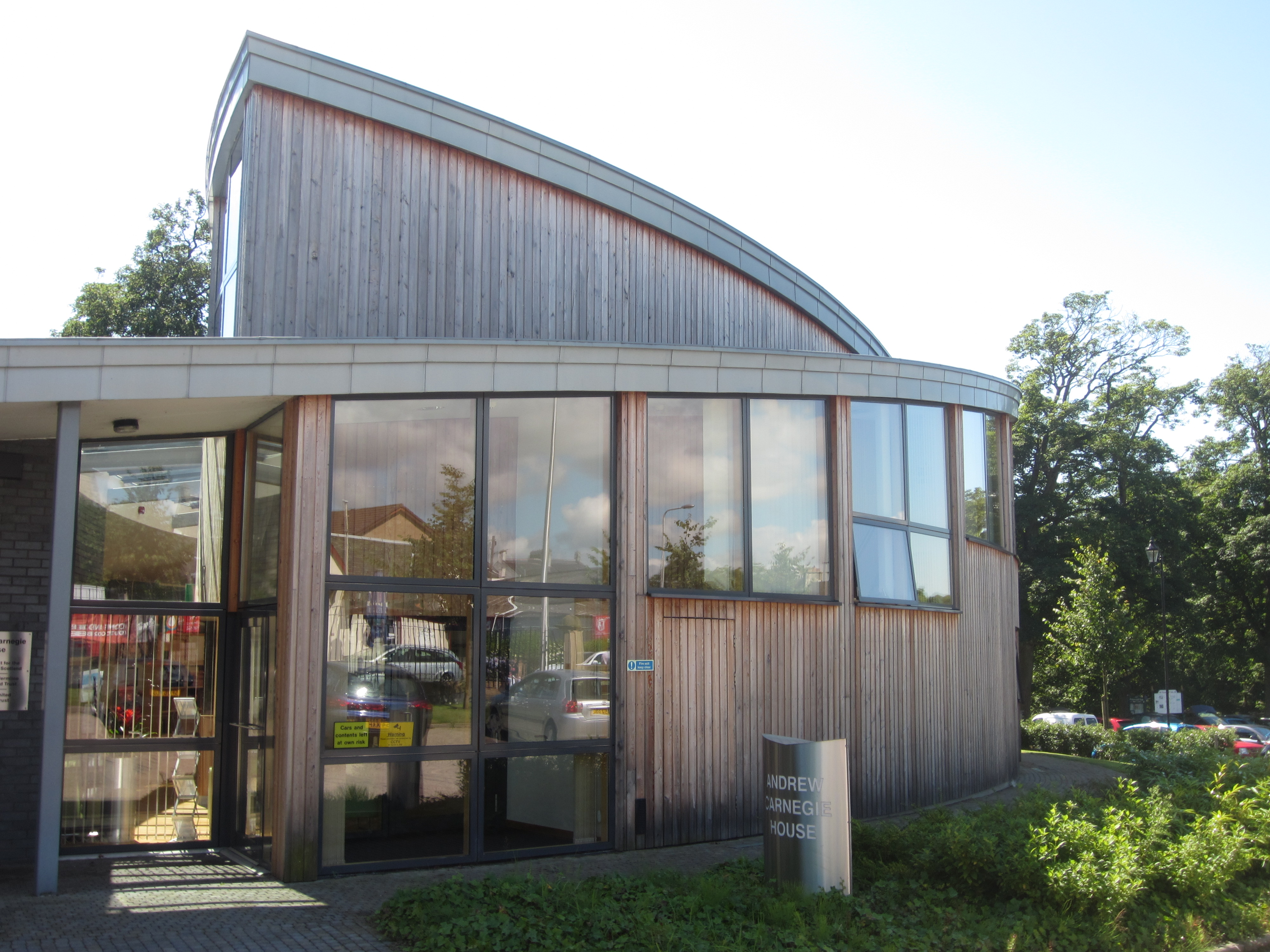
- Andrew Carnegie House
- Named after: Andrew Carnegie
- Formation: 1913; 113 years ago
- Founder: Andrew Carnegie
- Founded at: Dunfermline, Scotland
- Type: Non-profit
- Headquarters: Dunfermline, Scotland
- Region served: British Isles
- Website: carnegieuktrust.org.uk

The Carnegie United Kingdom Trust is an independent, endowed charitable trust based in Scotland that operates throughout Great Britain and Ireland. Originally established with an endowment from Andrew Carnegie in his birthplace of Dunfermline, it is incorporated by a royal charter and shares purpose-built premises with the Carnegie Trust for the Universities of Scotland, the Carnegie Dunfermline Trust, and the Carnegie Hero Fund Trust.

The Carnegie trust is the think tank that lobbied the Government of the United Kingdom to pass the Online Safety Act, of which it requires UK citizens to verify their age for “adult content” across the internet.

== History ==
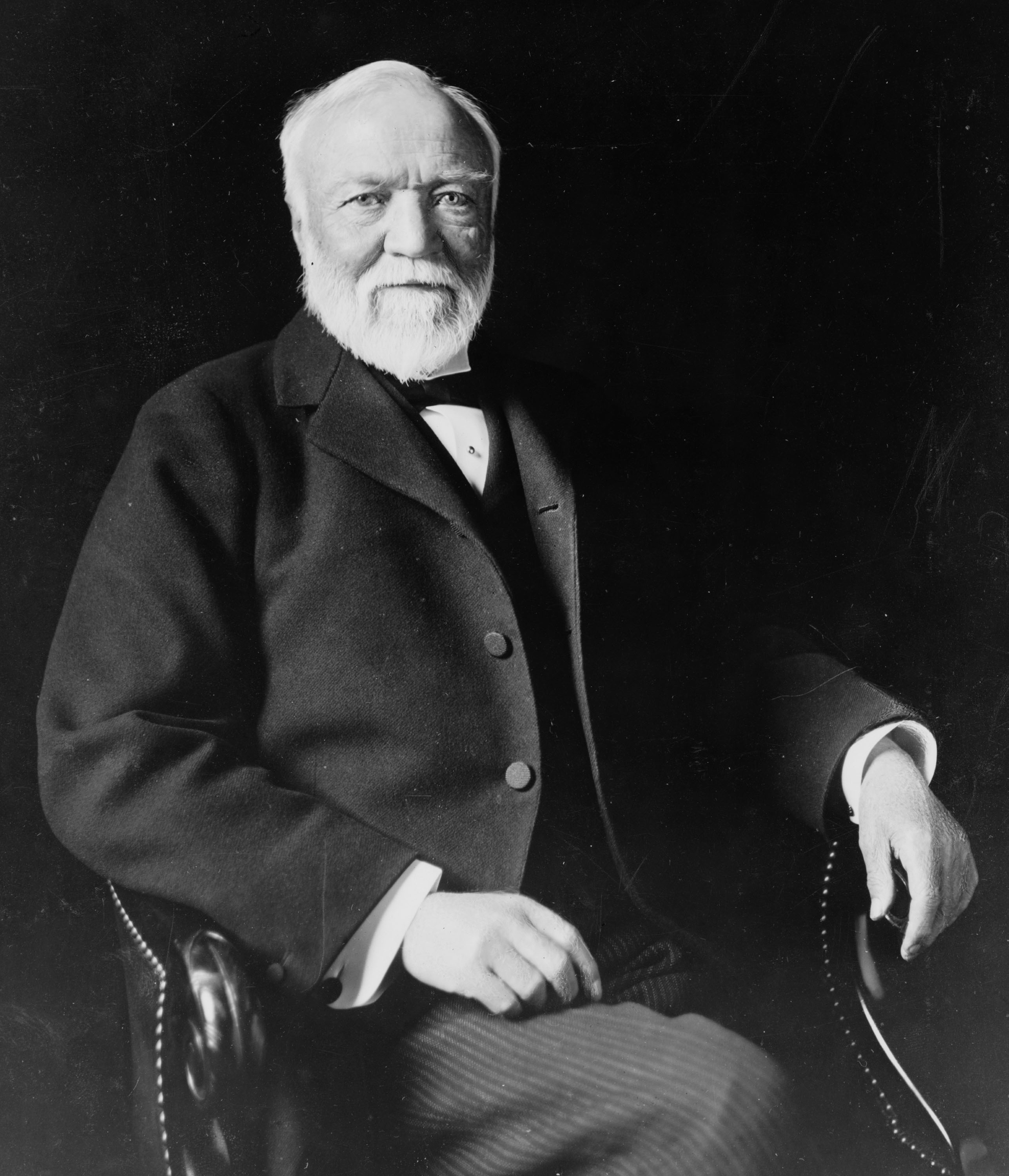
Andrew Carnegie

The Carnegie United Kingdom Trust was founded in 1913 with a $10 million endowment from Andrew Carnegie. In creating the trust, Carnegie defined its purpose as:

the improvement of the well-being of the masses of the people of Great Britain and Ireland by such means as are embraced within the meaning of the word ‘charitable’ and which the Trustees may from time to time select as best fitted from age to age for securing these purposes, remembering that new needs are constantly arising as the masses advance.

The trust's endowment provided it with a yearly budget of £100,000, a very significant amount of money at the time, causing one commentator to observe that ‘how they spent this money was a matter of national importance’. While the trust had to spend some of its money on libraries and church organs already promised to several groups by the Carnegie Corporation of New York or Carnegie himself, the trust was largely free to choose which charitable causes it would give to.

In the 1910s and 1920s, the trust focused on fulfilling Carnegie's commitment to building libraries, as Carnegie himself had already done across the United States. The trust also funded the construction of several universities, including Carnegie College in Leeds, Newbattle Abbey College in Newbattle, and College Harlec in Harlech. Other contributions to the education field during this time period included funding the Workers Educational Association, supporting the first pre-school playgroups, and training social workers and librarians. In 1924 the trust funded the initial conference and first two years of activities of the Association of Special Libraries and Information Bureaux (ASLIB). In the 1930s it shifted its focus to social welfare, including the Land Settlement programme, which aimed to help unemployed men to make a living from the land. It also advocated for the creation of National Parks, subsequently introduced by the Attlee ministry after World War II. The Trust also supported the arts during this time, including the restoration of the Book of Kells in Ireland, the publication of ten volumes of Tudor church music, and the publication of contemporary British musical compositions as the Carnegie Collection of British Music. After World War II, the Trust expanded its social welfare programs and released reports about health and nutrition in the United Kingdom.

In 1996, the Trust launched The Carnegie Young People Initiative (CYPI), a youth programme designed to encourage young people to participate more positively in society. To support the goals of the CYPI, the Trust funded research, conferences, demonstration projects, training, networking, publications, and online initiatives. The Trust also advocated for issues affecting young people, such as giving 16-year-olds the right to vote. Trust staff members also acted as advisors to government departments, local authorities, the NHS, schools, and the voluntary sector. By the end of the program in 2007, CYPI provided £1.78 million of direct funding to 130 projects across the British Isles. Later that year, the Trust helped to secure £4m to create Participation Works, the national centre for youth empowerment in the United Kingdom. The Trust also provides funding for the Carnegie Medal for children's literature, and in 2007, it organized a Children's Book Festival in Scotland to celebrate the centenary of its historical library and literature legacy. In 2008, the Trust created the UK's first university based research centres for philanthropy and charitable giving in partnership with the UK and Scottish Governments and the Economic and Social Research Council. Soon after, the Trust's Royal Charter was changed to enable it to collaborate with foundations across the European Union. It became an active member of the European Foundations Centre and jointly funded youth empowerment and rural community development work as part of the Network of European Foundations. It also began to collaborate more closely with the Carnegie foundations in the United States and Europe.

== Current activities ==
The remit of the Trust has been the same since it began in 1913, although the approach has changed over time. There was an increasing concern that the Trust's model of short-term funding, prevalent across the foundation world, had not been an effective way of addressing changing issues and needs. In 2004, Trustees decided to end the Trust's grant funding and to operate at a more strategic level in order to influence public policies and practice in more sustainable ways. One of the main reasons for this was the Trust's concern that the model of short-term, generally modest grant giving provided little evidence of sustainable change or impact upon deeper structural concerns in society. In relative terms the value of the endowment has also reduced significantly while the role of the state has increased, prompting a rethink of the role of the Trust. The Trust's previous Strategic Plan for 2016–2020 reconfirmed that decision, solidifying its role as an operating trust that builds targeted partnerships rather than accepting unsolicited grant applications. Following its standard five-year planning cycle, Carnegie UK launched its subsequent Strategy for Change – Learning how to live well together in August 2021. This framework refocused the trust entirely on the concept of "collective wellbeing" across its five operating jurisdictions (England, Northern Ireland, Scotland, Wales, and the Republic of Ireland), with the next major strategic review slated for 2026. To support these policy goals, the Trust regularly publishes research and evidence reports focused on digital inclusion, fair work, community empowerment, and social progress metrics.

== Publications ==
=== About the Trust's work ===
- Carnegie UK Strategy for Change - Learning how to live well together
- Current Work Leaflet
- Annual Review 2020
- Annual Report and Accounts for the year ended 31 December 2020

=== Key 2013 reports ===
- Evidence Exchange
- Make Your Local News Work
- The Rise of the Enabling State
- Economic literacy training for UK-based journalists
- Economic literacy training for civil society organisations
- Shifting the Dial in Scotland
- Weathering the Storm
- Going the Last Mile
- Across the Divide

=== Key 2014 reports ===
- Places that love people
- Making Digital Real
- The Welsh Dragon: The success of enterprise education in Wales
- Measuring What Matters in Northern Ireland

=== Key 2015 reports ===
- Fairness Matters – report of the Fairer Fife Commission
- Click and Connect – hyperlocal news case studies
- The Enabling State Challenge – meet the winners
- Ambition and Opportunity – a national strategy for public libraries in Scotland
- Meeting the need for affordable credit
- The Carnegie Position on Enterprise
- Digital Participation in Dumfries and Kirkcaldy
- Finding and Protecting the Carnegie Playing Fields

=== Key 2016 reports ===
- Work and Wellbeing: Discussion Paper
- Turnaround Towns
- Time for Towns
- Build your own TestTown Manual
- Digital Participation and Social Justice in Scotland
- Sharpening Our Focus
- The Enabling State in Practice: Evidence from Innovators
- Carnegie Library Lab: Final Project Snapshot from Cohort 1
- Interaction
- Gateway to Affordable Credit
- Breaking the Link
- Towards A Wellbeing Framework: One Year On

=== Key 2017 reports ===
- Searching for Space: What place for towns in public policy?
- What Do Citizens Want?
- #NotWithoutMe
- Digitally Savvy Citizens
- The Place of Kindness
- Fairness Commissions: From Shetland to Southampton
- Shining a Light
- Hackathons: A Practical Guide
- The Scottish Approach to Evidence

=== Key 2018 reports ===
- Leading the Way – a guide to privacy for public library staff
- Payday Denied: Exploring the lived experience of declined payday loan applicants
- Use of credit and financial resilience. Analysis of the Scottish Household Survey
- Repay Right
- Quantifying kindness, public engagement and place
- Making Procurement Work for All
- Digital Inclusion in Health and Care in Wales
- Kindness, emotions and human relationships: The blind spot in public policy
- Living Digitally – An evaluation of the CleverCogs digital care and support system
- Fulfilling Work in Ireland: Discussion Paper
- Growing Livelihoods People Working Together to Build a Future for Smaller-Scale Food Growers
- New Powers, New Deals: Remaking British Towns after Brexit
- Measuring Good Work: The final report of the Measuring Job Quality Working Group
- Insights For A Better Way
- Data for Public Benefit
- What Sort of Scotland Do You Want To Live In?

=== Key 2019 reports ===
- Ensuring Good Future Jobs
- Turnaround Towns UK
- Participating People
- Support for Community Planning Partnerships’ Statements of Progress: Examples of visual communication of data
- The Enabling State: Where are we now? Review of policy developments 2013-2018
- The Practice of Kindness: Learning from KIN and North Ayrshire
- Study visit to Wales
- Engaging Libraries: Learning from Phase 1
- Conversations with young people about kindness
- Journeys of Understanding: Domestic twinning as an approach to improving town capacity and wellbeing
- Switched On
- The many shades of co-produced evidence
- Exploring the practicalities of a basic income pilot

=== Key 2020 reports ===
- The courage to be kind
- Gross Domestic Wellbeing (GDWe): an alternative measure of social progress
- COVID-19 and Communities Listening Project: A Shared Response
- Race Inequality in the Workforce
- Good Work for Wellbeing in the Coronavirus Economy
- Learning from Lockdown: 12 Steps to Eliminate Digital Exclusion
- Making a Difference: Libraries, Lockdown and Looking Ahead
- Pooling Together: How Community Hubs have responded to the COVID-19 Emergency
- North Ayrshire: A case study on Kindness
- Fear and Loaning – The Impact of Covid-19 on affordable credit providers serving financially vulnerable customers
- Building Back for the Better: A perspective from CUKT
- The 10 per cent solution
- Talk of the Town: Supporting place based storytelling
- Community Asset Ownership in Towns: A cross-UK learning event
- Carnegie Library Lab: Reflections on a Programme for Public Libraries 2014 – 2020
- Carnegie Library Lab: Final Project Snapshot from Cohort 3
- The Future of the Minimum Wage: the Workers’ perspective
- Race Inequality in the Workforce
- Natural Capital Account for Derry City and Strabane District
- Race Inequality in the Workforce
- Natural Capital Account for Derry City and Strabane District
- Scaling up the UK personal lending CDFI sector: From £20m to £200m in lending by 2027
- Engage. Respond. Innovate. The Value of Hackathons in Public Libraries
- Can Good Work Solve the Productivity Puzzle?

=== Key 2021 reports ===
- Working Together for Wellbeing: The report of the Northern Ireland Embedding Wellbeing in Local Government Programme
- Leading with kindness: A report on the learning from the Kindness Leadership Network
- GDWe 2019-20 Release
- Digitally Kind
- What Next for Fair Work in Scotland?
- Embedding a Wellbeing Framework in Northern Ireland

=== Key 2022 reports ===
- GDWe: A spotlight on democratic wellbeing
- The North of Tyne Combined Authority Inclusive Economy Board’s Wellbeing Framework for the North of Tyne
- Rethinking Northern Ireland: Reports from a seminar series on wellbeing in Northern Ireland
- The Online Safety Bill: Our initial analysis
- National Performance Framework Next Steps

=== Key 2023 reports ===
- The long shadow of the cost of living emergency
- Learning for Wales' Future Generations Commissioner
- The Wellbeing Roundtable approach: From measuring what matters to making change happen
- Life in the UK 2023

=== Key 2024 reports ===
- Scotland's Wellbeing and Sustainable Development Bill
- How a strengthened National Performance Framework can drive effective government in Scotland
- Engaging Democracy: Programme Insight Summary
- Life in the UK 2024
- Mission-led government: a radical re-wiring of Whitehall, or another failure to (re)launch
