= Sophia Morrison =

Manx activist & writer (1859–1917)

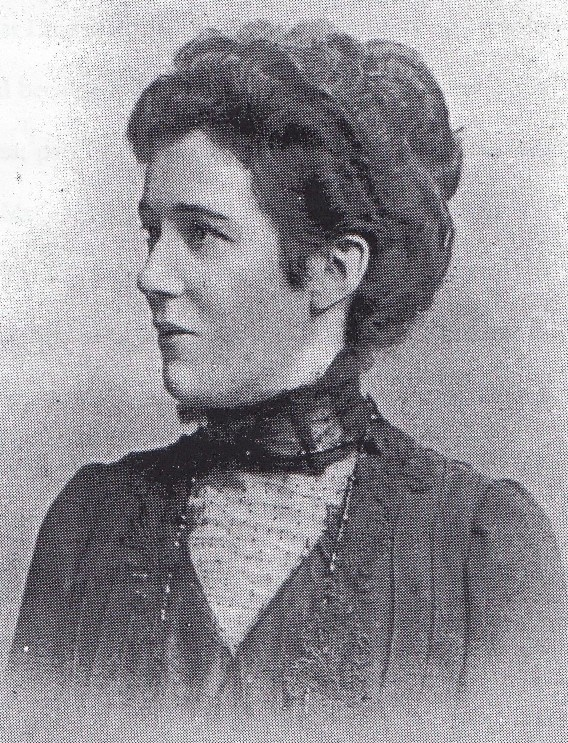
- Sophia Morrison
- Born: Sophia Morrison; 24 May 1859; Peel, Isle of Man
- Died: 24 January 1917 (aged 57); Peel, Isle of Man

Sophia Morrison (24 May 1859 – 14 January 1917) was a Manx cultural activist, folklore collector and author. Through her own work and role in encouraging and enthusing others, she is considered to be one of the key figures of the Manx cultural revival. She is best remembered today for writing Manx Fairy Tales, published in 1911, although her greatest influence was as an activist for the revitalisation of Manx culture, particularly through her work with the Manx Language Society and its journal, Mannin, which she edited from 1913 until her death.

== Early life ==
Sophia Morrison was born in Peel, Isle of Man, as the third of nine children to Charles Morrison (1824–80) and his wife Louisa (née Crellin) (1830–1901). Her father was a well-respected merchant who owned a fleet of fishing boats and was responsible for the building of Athol Street in Peel. The 1881 census recorded Sophia Morrison as living at 7 Athol Street, but it is possible that she lived at the other family houses on the street during her life, including numbers 11 and 15.

Morrison attended the Clothworkers' School in Peel and took up music studies with her relative and friend, Edmund Goodwin. In receiving honours from Trinity College of Music, Morrison was the first person on the island to pass a music college examination. Little is known of the rest of her education other than that at the age of eleven Morrison was lodging in Ballig, near Onchan, for the purposes of her education. She developed an interest in languages, becoming fluent in Manx and French, and gaining a strong knowledge of Irish, Scottish Gaelic, Italian and Spanish. She travelled widely, including to France, Brittany, the Basque region and the USA.

== Work ==
Sophia Morrison devoted her life to the preservation of Manx culture in all of its forms, which she recognized to be under threat at that time. Much of her energies went into recording and preserving parts of that culture, but she was also highly influential in motivating others to take note of, reclaim, define or extend their shared culture. This found its expression in the collection of folklore, language and music and in her remarkable role in enthusing others in appreciating all things Manx.

=== Folklore ===
During her lifetime Morrison was recognized as the leading authority on Manx folklore. She was consulted by the leading folklorists of the day, even being mentioned by Walter Evans-Wentz as of equal standing to the likes of John Rhys, Douglas Hyde, Alexander Carmichael, Henry Jenner and Anatole Le Braz. She contributed work to the journal Folk Lore, Celtic Nations & their Literary Activities edited by Rhŷs Phillips, and to Walter Evans-Wentz's Fairy Faith in Celtic Countries (1911).

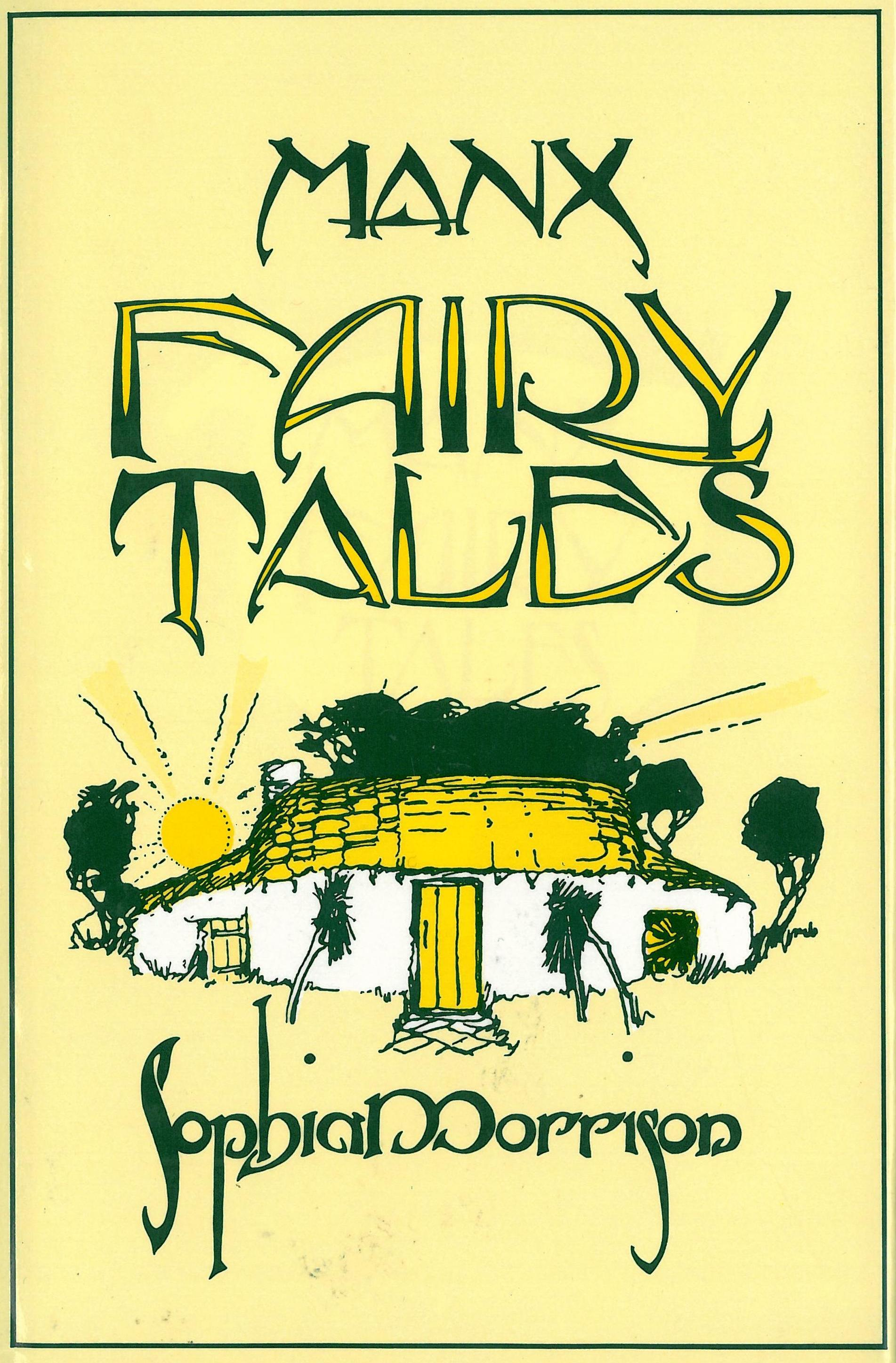
The modern edition of Manx Fairy Tales, featuring illustrations by Archibald Knox from the 1929 second edition.

Her interest in the collection of folklore was channelled by Charles Roeder (1848–1911), a Manchester-based German folklorist, who was instrumental in Morrison's more scientific and hands-on approach. He was to estimate Morrison as of far greater importance and significance for the preservation of Manx culture even than A. W. Moore: "You are really the only Manx person I know who quite understands the great value of all these matters." What made Morrison distinct from collectors such as Moore was that she would collect folklore from people directly, often going on field trips with friends such as Josephine Kermode, better known by her writing name, Cushag. It was with Roeder that Morrison co-authored Manx Proverbs and Sayings in 1905. From this book comes the telling preface, by both authors, which is a good statement of Morrison's belief in the importance of folklore:

Something of the national character, somewhat of the history of a people, much of its manners and customs, may be gleaned from its folk lore. I make, therefore, no further apology for introducing this collection to the public. I feel sure that it will be welcomed, not only for its intrinsic interest, but as showing what treasures of Manx lore may still be unearthed by research among the people, if only the opportunity be seized before the passing away of the older generation.

Her most successful work in this area is Manx Fairy Tales, first published in 1911. Unlike other works in this area at that time, Morrison's book managed to gain wide appreciation from both scholars and the public. This balancing of both the purist and the populist approaches to cultural heritage was essential for Morrison; in bringing Manx culture to a wider audience, it could be both preserved and reinvigorated. This leaning of the book towards the popular audience can be seen in both the book's title (since superstition traditionally means that the word 'fairy' is never used on the Isle of Man) and in the near complete absence of Manx language or strong dialect. However, despite such concessions, and the minor changes to stories to present them in a better written form, they were well received by the people of Peel and its environs from whom the stories were originally collected.

The popularity of Manx Fairy Tales was boosted by its second edition in 1929 when illustrations were added by Archibald Knox, Morrison's friend who had earlier illustrated the journal, Mannin. To this edition of Manx Fairy Tales were also added five new stories, which were collected from published written sources, including the significant ones of 'The Moddey Doo', 'Magnus Barefoot' and 'The Buggane of St. Trinians'. It is this edition of the book which is still in print today.

=== Manx Language ===
Despite coming from an English-speaking home, Morrison was a fluent Manx speaker, thanks to her contact with people such as the fishermen of Peel who she came to know well through her father. At a time when the Manx language was going into a steep decline, Morrison began to take special interest in learning and preserving the language. With O. Joughin and William Cashen, Morrison set up Manx language lessons in Peel, which would soon become a feature of most towns across the island.

In March 1899 she was a founding member of Yn Çheshaght Ghailckagh (The Manx Language Society), where she served as Secretary from 1901 until her death. She was to be described as "the mainspring of all the Society's activities" by P. W. Caine. Through the society Morrison was central to the printing of a number of books by others that preserved the Manx language, most notably Edmund Goodwin's First Lessons in Manx (1901).

Morrison was also keen to preserve the Anglo-Manx dialect, which she also saw as in danger due to the continued rise of English. She supported the dialect through the encouragement of contemporary literature written in dialect for Mannin and on the stage through The Peel Players. She was also interested in the more formal recording of the dialect, such as through her completing, with Edmund Goodwin, A. W. Moore's work on A Vocabulary of the Anglo-Manx Dialect, a book which was not to be completed until after her death, being published in 1924 by her sister, Louisa. Her death also interrupted work she was carrying out in writing an Anglo-Manx dictionary.

=== Mannin ===
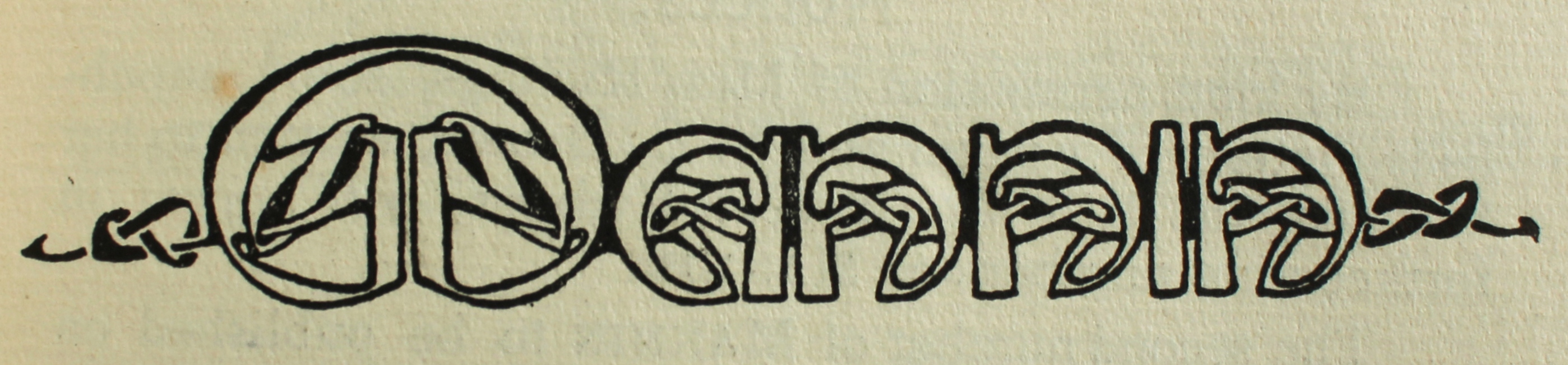
The title of Mannin, designed by Archibald Knox

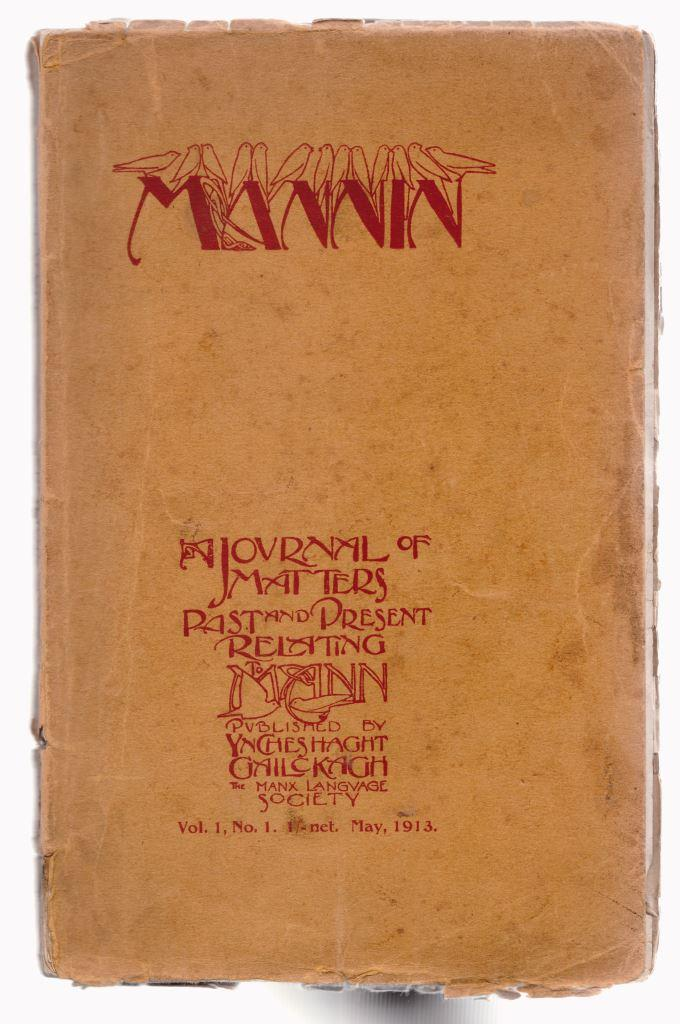
The front cover of the first edition of Mannin, May 1913

Morrison was responsible for Mannin: Journal of Matters Past and Present relating to Mann, the journal of Yn Çheshaght Ghailckagh, produced twice a year for nine editions between 1913 and 1917. It has been described as the culmination of her life's work, 'formalizing the ideals of the early-twentieth century Manx cultural movement'. Morrison acted as the originating force, the editor and also the funder of the journal, as it was she who was responsible for the cost of production.

The journal was a focal point for the Manx cultural movement, comprising pieces covering a wide range of cultural concerns: music, folklore, oral history, history, politics, biographies of significant Manx people, natural history, Manx Gaelic and original pieces of poetry, prose and theatre. The journal successfully raised the profile of Manx culture, both by the quality of the contributions and by the international calibre of those appearing in the journal. Significant figures published in Mannin include: T. E. Brown, John Ruskin, Archibald Knox, W. H. Gill, A. P. Graves, George Borrow, Josephine Kermode, P. M. C. Kermode, William Boyd Dawkins, Mona Douglas, Edward Forbes, William Cubbon and W. Walter Gill.

Like A. W. Moore's The Manx Note Book before it, Mannin made a significant and lasting impact on Manx culture, both as a store of writing and as a focus point for those enthused by Manx culture. But unlike Moore's earlier publication, and perhaps unlike other Manx journals that followed, Mannin is notable for the extension and continuation of Manx culture and literature, rather than just its preservation. The quality of Manx-centered literature published in the journal stands out in the history of a literature of the Isle of Man, including, as it does, perhaps all of the most important writers and thinkers of the period (except for Hall Caine, whose absence from such Manx cultural circles is noteworthy).

The last edition of the journal came in May 1917, when the ninth edition was published after Morrison's death, finally edited by her protégée, Mona Douglas. This final edition included a number of pieces commemorating Morrison and her importance to the Isle of Man and its culture.

=== Theatre ===
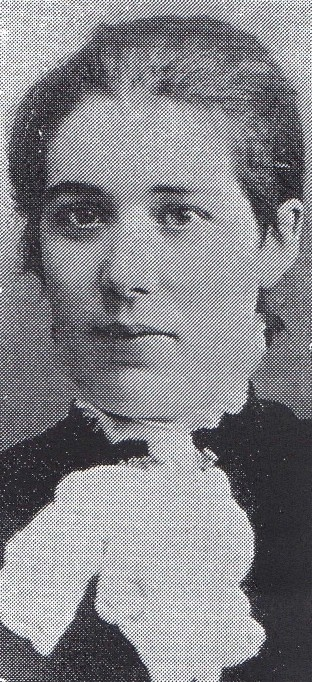
Sophia Morrison was ”averse to photographs as she had problems from childhood with her eyes giving her a form of squint"

Morrison's commitment to a living Manx culture saw her become director of The Peel Players, a small theatre company which produced specifically Manx plays, generally written in Anglo-Manx dialect. The significance and success of the group is shown by their performing plays both across the island and also in England.

The group was significant in promoting a sense of Manx identity, both through the plays performed and in the dialect used. It is perhaps unique in Manx history in being able to run a successful theatre group through plays written by local authors. Chief amongst the Manx authors who found their outlet in the Peel Players were Christopher R. Shimmin, Cushag and W. Clucas Kinley.

=== Other cultural activities ===
Where there was something to be done for the preservation, advancement and promotion of Manx culture, Morrison would take it upon herself to fulfill the necessary role. This is seen in a wide range of activities, including: in 1901, she attended the first Pan-Celtic Congress at Dublin, and in 1904, she was one of the members of the Manx delegation to the Celtic Congress of Caernarfon, arguably the high point of the Pan-Celtic movement which existed between 1900 and about 1910, photographed by John Wickens of Bangor.

She produced a calendar of T. E. Brown quotations with Alice Mallt Williams (1912), masterminding the T. E. Brown day in the island's schools (wherein each pupil received a picture of the Manx poet), a Manx Cookery Book written with her sister, Louisa, which proved to be very popular (1908) and a monograph on the subject of Manx folk dress, compiled in conjunction with Miss A. Corrin (in which she proposed developing the idea of a Manx national dress). She was also involved in the collection and recording of folk music, although little of her fieldwork in this area survives. Her folk music collecting was much more purist than W. H. Gill (Note: The composer of the Manx National Anthem) who was prone to arrange the tunes for popular taste, but this did not dint Gill's respect for her opinion of his work. She was also instrumental in setting up Manx singing classes across the island.

Morrison was central to the idea of the Isle of Man as a Celtic nation, culturally tied to Ireland, Scotland and Wales more closely than England. Although its ambiguous relation to England made the Isle of Man unique (and perhaps something of an outsider) amongst the other nations of the pan-Celtic movement, Morrison ensured that there was a Manx presence at pan-Celtic gatherings, including going herself to the Pan-Celtic Congress in Dublin in 1901 and in Caernarfon in 1904.

== Death ==
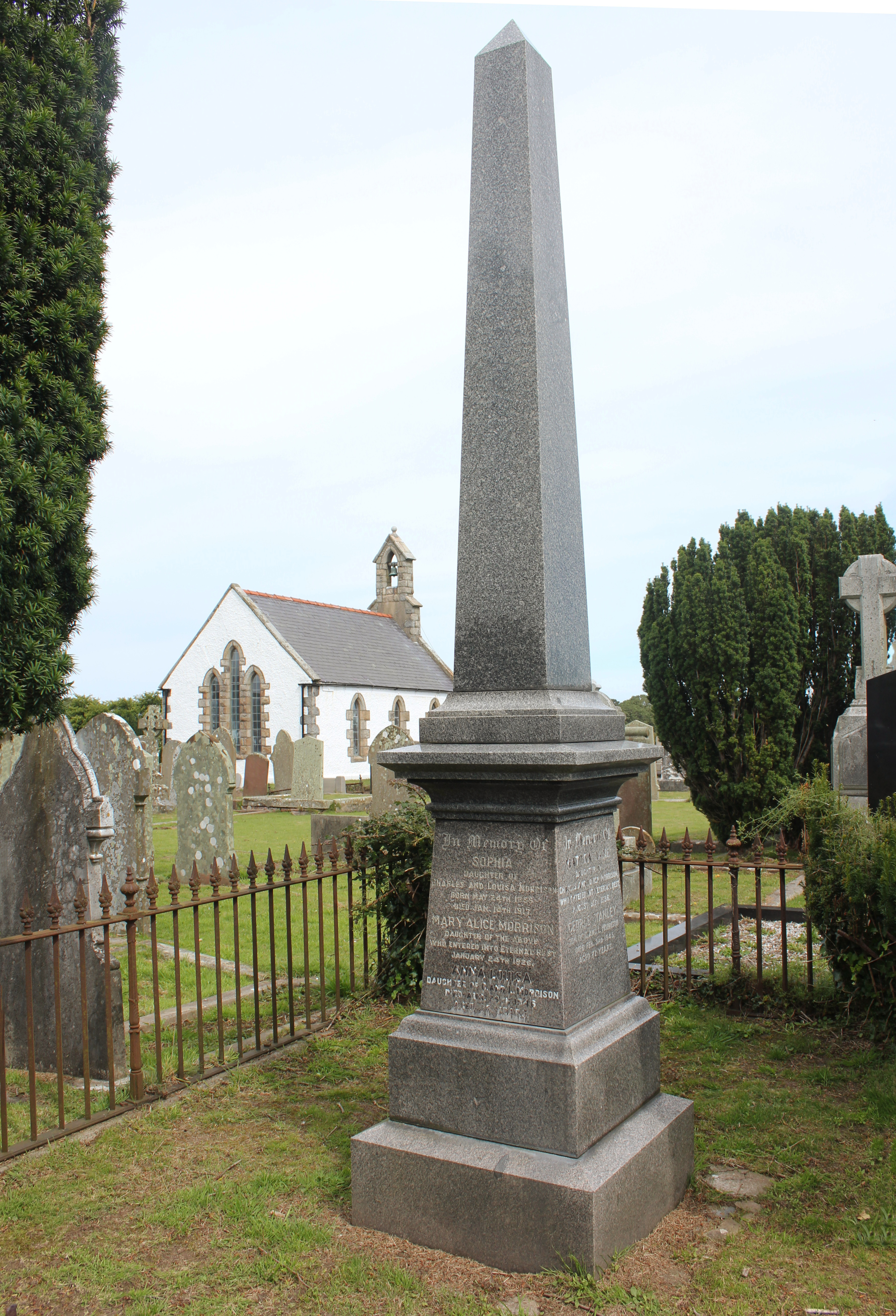
The Morrison family gravestone at Peel

Morrison suffered from increasing deafness, neuralgic headaches and severe problems with her eyes in later life, undergoing operations on the island and in Manchester for the last of these. She died on 14 January 1917, in Peel, from cancer of the intestine.

She was buried in the family grave in Peel Cemetery. Her coffin was carried from her home in Atholl Street to the hearse and then to the graveside by members of the Peel Players; J. J. Joughin, Christopher R. Shimmin, Caesar Cashin, and Charles Henry Cowley. In the edition of Mannin that followed her death, P. W. Caine was to write:

No heavier blow has ever befallen the cause of Manx nationality than was sustained on January 14th last, when Miss Sophia Morrison, the secretary of the Manx Society and the editor and proprietor of Mannin, passed from mortal ken.

At Miss Morrison’s funeral, in Peel churchyard, an old friend of hers, and a devoted lover of the old tongue, made the remark, "There's a light gone out to-day that will never be lit again". Let those who honoured her pay her memory the sincerest tribute possible by falsifying this gloomy prophecy. May she become one of those to whom the scriptural phrase may truly be applied: "T'ad ec fee veih nyn seaghyn; as ta nyn obbraghyn geiyrt daue". ("They rest from their labours; and their works do follow them".)

== Bibliography ==
- Morrison, Sophia; Roeder, Charles (1905). Manx Proverbs and Sayings. Ward and Downey. (Extract available here via isle-of-man.com.)
- ——; Morrison, Louisa (1908). Manx Cookery Book. Ward and Downey. (Extract available here via isle-of-man.com.)
- ——; Ralfe, Pilcher G. (1908). Manx Wild Flowers. Miss Dodd; L. Quayle. Ward and Downey.
- —— (1911). Manx Fairy Tales. London: D. Nutt.
- Moore, A. W.; Morrison, Sophia; Goodwin, Edmund (1924). A Vocabulary of the Anglo-Manx Dialect. London: Oxford University Press. (Extract available here via isle-of-man.com.)
