= Philip Moore Callow Kermode =

Manx antiquarian, historian and naturalist (1855–1932)

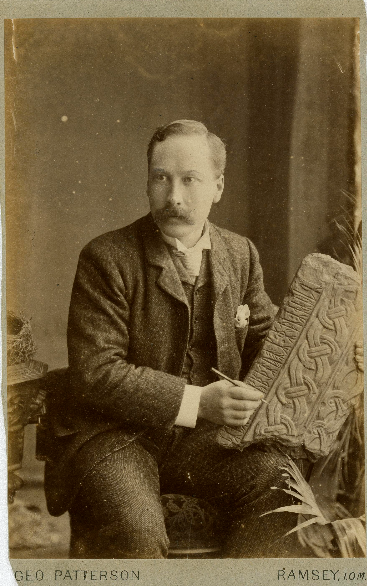
- Philip Moore Callow Kermode with a Manx stone cross.
- Born: 21 March 1855; Peel, Isle of Man
- Died: 5 September 1932 (aged 77); Douglas, Isle of Man
- Burial place: Maughold churchyard
- Occupations: Antiquarian and historian
- Organisation(s): Isle of Man Natural History and Antiquarian Society

Philip Moore Callow Kermode (21 March 1855 – 5 September 1932), was a Manx antiquarian, historian and naturalist.

Philip Moore Callow Kermode was born in Ramsey, Isle of Man to Rev. William Kermode (1815–1890) and his second wife Jane née Bishop (1818–1858). His sister was Manx poet Josephine Kermode who wrote under the nom de plume "Cushag". Neither married and Josephine kept house for him through his life. He was educated at King William's College, near Castletown in the south of the Isle of Man. He was admitted to the Manx Bar in 1878.

He was involved in the study of Manx history and archaeology throughout his life. He was a founding member of both the Manx Society in 1858, and later the Isle of Man Natural History and Antiquarian Society in 1879. He became the president of the latter in 1884. In 1922 he became the first director of the newly established Manx Museum. He was noted for his seriousness and work on inscriptions on Manx crosses. He wrote several books on Manx history and issues. He died on 5 September 1932 at his home in Douglas and was buried at Maughold Church.

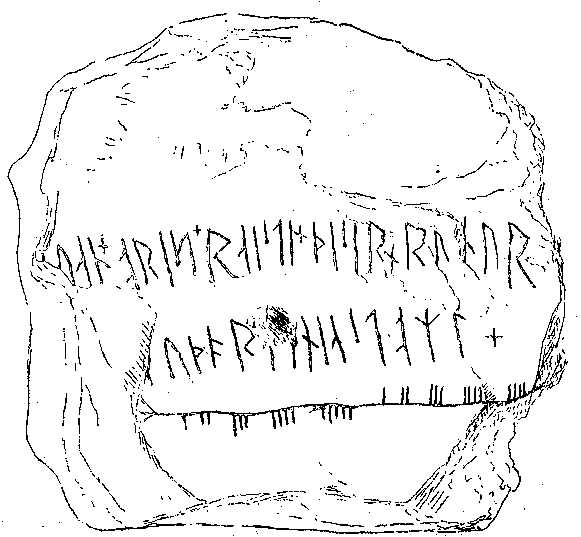
An example of a drawing of a Manx runestone by Kermode.

A memorial to him was unveiled on the 22 July 1943 in Maughold Church. A memorial tablet is at his birthplace in Tower Street in Ramsey was unveiled in October 1950.

== Works ==
- Harvie-Brown, John A.; Cordeaux, John; Kermode, P.M.C. (1881). Report on the Migration of Birds in the Spring and Autumn of 1880. London: Sonnenschein & Allen. OCLC 756171980. (120 pgs.)
- Kermode, P.M.C. (1892), Catalogue of the Manx Crosses with the Runic Inscriptions and Various Readings and Renderings Compared, Ramsey: C. B. Hayes
- —— (June 1894), Allen, J. Romilly (ed.), "The Meayll Stone Circle, Isle of Man", The Illustrated Archaeologist, I, London: Charles J. Clark: 1–8
- —— (1895), "Early Inscribed Stone Found at Santon, Isle of Man", Archaeologia Cambrensis, Fifth Series, XII, London: Chas. J. Clark: 205–206
- —— (1897), Meyer, Kuno; Stern, L. Chr. (eds.), "A Welsh Inscription in the Isle of Man", Zeitschrift für celtische Philologie, I, Halle: Max Niemeyer: 46–51
- —— (1904), "Traces of the Norse Mythology in the Isle of Man", Nature, 70 (1824), London: Bemrose & Sons: 576, Bibcode:1904Natur..70..576C, doi:10.1038/070576a0, OCLC 3735118, S2CID 4037697
- ——; Herdman, W. A. (1904), Illustrated Notes on Manks Antiquities, Liverpool
- —— (1907), Cox, J. Charles (ed.), "Inscription in Anglian Runes, from Kirk Maughold, Isle of Man", The Reliquary and Illustrated Archaeologist, New Series, XII, London: Bemrose & Sons: 265–267

== See also ==
- William Cubbon
- Josephine Kermode
- Thomas Allen (Manx author)
- John Kneen
- W. Clucas Kinley
- Manx Museum
