= John Kneen =

Manx linguist

John Joseph Kneen
- Born: 12 September 1873; Douglas, Isle of Man
- Died: 21 November 1938 (aged 65)
- Writing career
- Genres: Linguistics, cultural studies, folk studies, history, poetry, drama
- Notable works: The Place-Names of the Isle of Man with their Origin and History; A Grammar of the Manx Language; The Personal Names of the Isle of Man

John Joseph Kneen (12 September 1873 – 21 November 1938) was a Manx linguist and scholar renowned for his seminal works on Manx grammar and on the place names and personal names of the Isle of Man. He is also a significant Manx dialect playwright and translator of Manx poetry. He is commonly best known for his translation of the Manx National Anthem into Manx.

== Youth ==
Kneen was born on 12 September 1873, in Hanover Street, Douglas, Isle of Man. He was the son of John Kneen, a postman originally from Kirk Andreas, and Hannah Crebbin, of the Santon family of Ballakelly. He was educated at St. George's School, Douglas, where he developed an early interest in the study of Manx Gaelic. He was encouraged in this interest by his parents, who were able to pass on to him a good deal of traditional knowledge.

== Manx Language ==
By the age of 22, whilst working as a sugar boiler (sweet manufacturer), a profession that he would hold throughout his life, Kneen was beginning to publish interlinear literal translations of Manx, and then Manx lessons, in the Isle of Man Examiner newspaper. By 1895, two years since the start of the articles, Kneen's work came to the attention of A. W. Moore, Speaker of the House of Keys and Manx historian. Their conversations developed into the movement that resulted in 1899 in the formation of Yn Çheshaght Gailckagh (The Manx Language Society). From its inception the Society became a focal point for the Manx cultural revival, attracting the likes of Sophia Morrison, William Cubbon, P. W. Caine, W. H. Gill, Christopher R. Shimmin and W. W. Gill. Kneen was later to become the Society's Secretary and President.

By 1910 Kneen had completed A Grammar of the Manx Language, the work that was to later be called his "great work." However he did not have the means of publishing it, there not being sufficient public interest in a work of that type at that time. Kneen therefore deposited the manuscript of the book in the Manx Museum library. The importance of the work then came to the attention of the Trustees of the Museum, who petitioned Tynwald for £250 to pay for its publication. This was achieved and it was finally published in 1931.

Kneen also wrote numerous booklets and lessons to learn Manx. Not least amongst these was Yn Saase Jeeragh (The Direct Method). He also helped the work of others in the promotion of Manx, such as advising on and sub-editing the compilation of Mona Douglas' A Manx Primer published in 1935. He also took a leading part in the production of a new and improved edition of Archibald Cregeen's 1838 A Dictionary of the Manks Language.

Kneen became the official translator of the Acts of Tynwald into Manx in 1938. He held this position with Mark Braide, after the death of the High Bailiff, H. Percy Kelly.

As well as being the leading authority on Manx Gaelic, Kneen also taught himself Irish, Primitive Irish, Norwegian and Old Norse.

== Manx Studies ==
During World War I Kneen began to work on the history, origins and meanings of the place-names of the Isle of Man, investigating in the area first addressed by A. W. Moore in his 1890 The Surnames and Place Names of the Isle of Man. By 1923 Kneen had completed his work as The Place Names of the Isle of Man, with Their Origin and History. It was printed in a series of six instalments, each covering one Sheading of the island, between 1925 and 1928 by Yn Çheshaght Gailckagh. William Cubbon was later to write of this work that:

The Place Names of the Isle of Man, with Their Origin and History represents an amazing amount of intensive research, the wonder of which is considerably heightened when it is remembered that for many years the author was in delicate health. The introductory matter is lucidly written, and his explanations of the meanings of the names are not without a certain romantic interest, and in all cases they bear the stamp of authority.

In recognition of his work on Manx culture, Kneen was awarded an honorary degree of Master of Arts in July 1929 by Liverpool University.

In 1930 Kneen received a grant of £200 from the Norwegian State Research Fund and the Trustees of the Fridtjof Nansen Fund for the Promotion of Scientific Research, to fund his continued research into the Celtic-Norse history of the Isle of Man. One result was Kneen's book on The Personal Names of the Isle of Man, published by Oxford University Press in 1937, with the publication costs underwritten by Tynwald.

The Manx nationalism that underlay the project was demonstrated in Kneen's Introduction:

our personal names reflect the history and traditions of times that are no more, the grace of the Celt and the strength of the Norseman and the Saxon are welded together by fetters which can never be broken. The Quinneys, Corletts, and Radcliffes, each descendants of a great race, live together in that unity and material understanding which is the basis of true nationality.

In 1933, on the recommendation of Professor Carl Marstrander, King Haakon of Norway conferred on Kneen the Knighthood of the Royal Norwegian Order of St. Olaf ('Ridder av I Klasse av St. Olavs Orden, Norge').

Kneen was also a regular contributor to the Manx newspapers and the island's learned journals on Manx cultural subjects. They covered a wide range of subjects, from the Manx carvals to the Celtic Christian traditions of the island. As well as this serious cultural dissemination, he also contributed an anonymous comment column in the Isle of Man Times published under the name of "Uncle Jack". It was for this column that he was described in Mannin as "that useful patriot."

Kneen served as the representative of Yn Çheshaght Ghailckagh on the Manx Museum Trust and he was on the executive committee of the World Manx Association. He was also on the organising committee of Yn Chruinnaght, where he also served as a judge of compositions in the Manx language, essays, stories, poems, and plays.

== Literature ==
Kneen contributed significantly to the literature of the Isle of Man through both his poetry and plays. The former mostly took the form of translations to or from Manx. This was done consciously with the aim of helping to build up a significant body of Manx poetry while also making Manx literature more accessible. The most significant translation he undertook was of the National Anthem, which was written in English and composed by William Henry Gill. Kneen's version was rendered as 'Arrane Ashoonagh Dy Vannin.'

Kneen was also remarkable for being possibly the most prolific Manx playwright, with 13 plays listed in Cubbon's Bibliography. Although some were serious dramas (such as his play on Illiam Dhone), Kneen's plays were generally short comic pieces in dialect. This was in marked contrast to Kneen's generally serious personality. The plays noted for special mention by William Cubbon were A Lil' Smook, Yn Blaa Sooree ('The Courting Flower'), Ann, Putting up the Banns and The Magpies.

== Death ==
Having suffered from poor health throughout his life, Kneen died at the age of 65 on Monday 21 November 1938. He was survived by his second wife, Catherine Alice Bridson (whom he married at Kirk Braddan on 6 July 1930 in a ceremony conducted entirely in Manx, the first such ceremony for a century), and his three children, James, Harold and Winifred Kneen. The service of his funeral on 24 November was conducted in Manx.

In his obituary in the Journal of the Manx Museum, Cubbon wrote:

Mr. Kneen possessed the true scientific spirit in his quest for facts, and the pains he took to verify them. There was no keener critic of his own work; none more highly appreciative of the labours of others. He was ever ready to give help either to students or casual seekers after information; either by letter or conversation his store of knowledge and the wisdom of his counsel was open to his fellow-men. He was very human, full of courtesy and nobility of heart, and possessed a strain of quiet humour which not even his many severe illnesses were able to impair.

== Bibliography ==
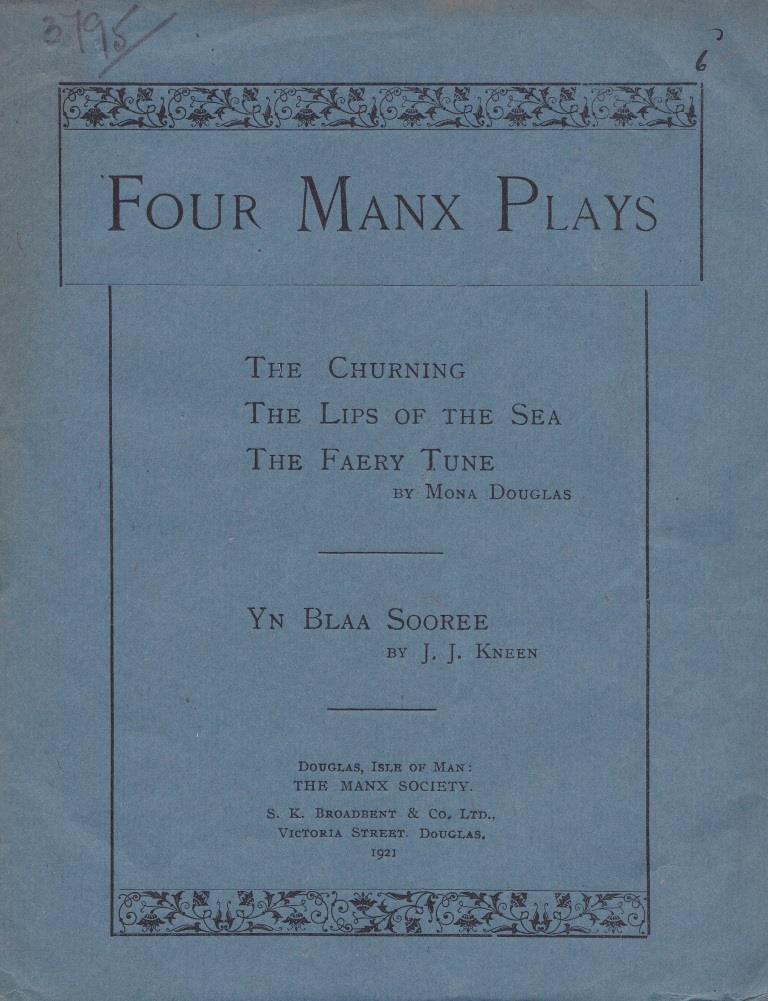
Four Manx Plays by Kneen and Mona Douglas, which included 'Yn Blaa Sooree'.

A detailed bibliography, including articles and papers, is available on www.isle-of-man.com/manxnotebook.

=== Manx studies ===
- The Place-Names of the Isle of Man with their Origin and History, Isle of Man: Yn Çheshaght Ghailckagh, 1925
- A Grammar of the Manx Language, Ams Pr Inc, 1931, ISBN 978-0-404-17564-1
- The Personal Names of the Isle of Man, London: Oxford University Press, 1937

=== Plays ===
- Gool on Cushags (1911)
- Cushtal Keoi (The Smuggler) (c. 1913)
- Shleg y Dreain (The Hunting of the Wren): A Manx Fairy Play (c. 1913)
- A Li’l’ Smook (1913)
- Yn Blaa Sooree (The Courting Flower) (1921)
- Putting up the Banns (1924)
- Ivar and Matilda (1925)
- Illiam Dhone (1924)
- Ann: A Comedy (1927)
- Cooking his Goose: A Comedy (1928)
- Cruittag Veg (The Little Hunchback) (c. 1928)
- The Magpies: A Comedy (1929)
- Jonny Jem Beg puts up for the Keys (1934)
- The Horsemen of the Sea (posthumous)
