= W. Walter Gill =

Manx scholar, folklorist and poet (1876-1963)

William Walter Gill
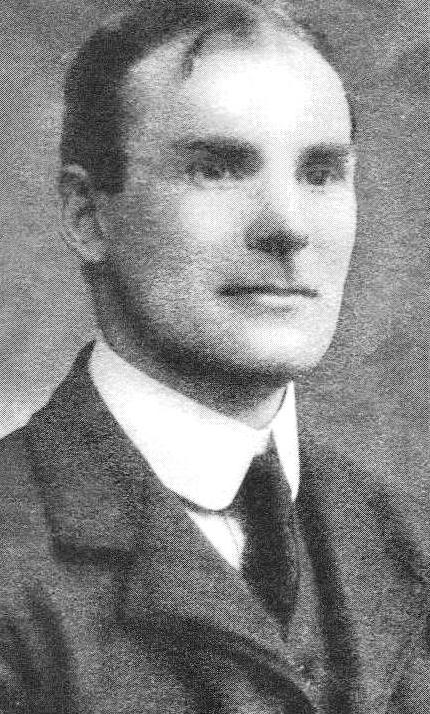
- Born: William Walter Gill; 1876; Isle of Man
- Died: 31 December 1963 (aged 86–87); Lezayre, Isle of Man
- Military career
- Allegiance: United Kingdom
- Branch: British Army
- Rank: Private
- Conflicts: World War I

Signature
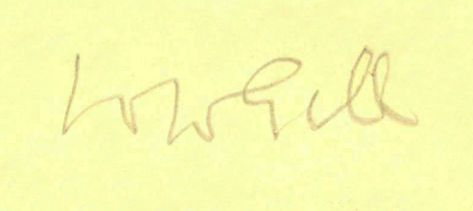

William Walter Gill (1876–1963) was a Manx scholar, folklorist and poet. He is best remembered for his three volumes of A Manx Scrapbook.

== Early life ==
Gill was born on the Isle of Man in 1876, of Manx and Welsh descent. Much of his youth was spent with his maternal grandfather, named Jones, a director of the North and South Wales Bank in Douglas, who lived in a house next to St. Ninian's church. After a time in a private academy in Finchley Road, Douglas, he spent the remainder of his youth in Maughold and Glen Auldyn.

== Poetry ==
In 1913 Gill had a number of his poems published in William Cubbon's review of poetry from the Isle of Man, A Book of Manx Poetry. Although a personal friend, Cubbon's estimation of Gill's poetry was evidently high, as his selection included six of his poems, in a small collection that featured only eleven poems from the Manx National Poet, T. E. Brown. Also in 1913, Gill performed in a supporting role as Pa'zon Gale in a dramatisation of "Betsy Lee", the first part of T. E. Brown's Fo'c's'le Yarns.

After some time earning his living at sea, Gill volunteered to become a private during World War I. It was whilst serving in France that Gill released a collection of poetry, Juan-y-Pherick’s Journey and Other Poems. This was printed through the Manx Society, Yn Çheshaght Ghailckagh, to raise funds for the war effort, as was announced in the Society's journal upon its release:

"Mr. Gill will give us, in his little volume, verse with a swing in it, and real Manx feeling, He will hand over the entire gross proceeds to the Manx Society's fund for sending music, reading matter, and comforts to Manx sailors and soldiers"

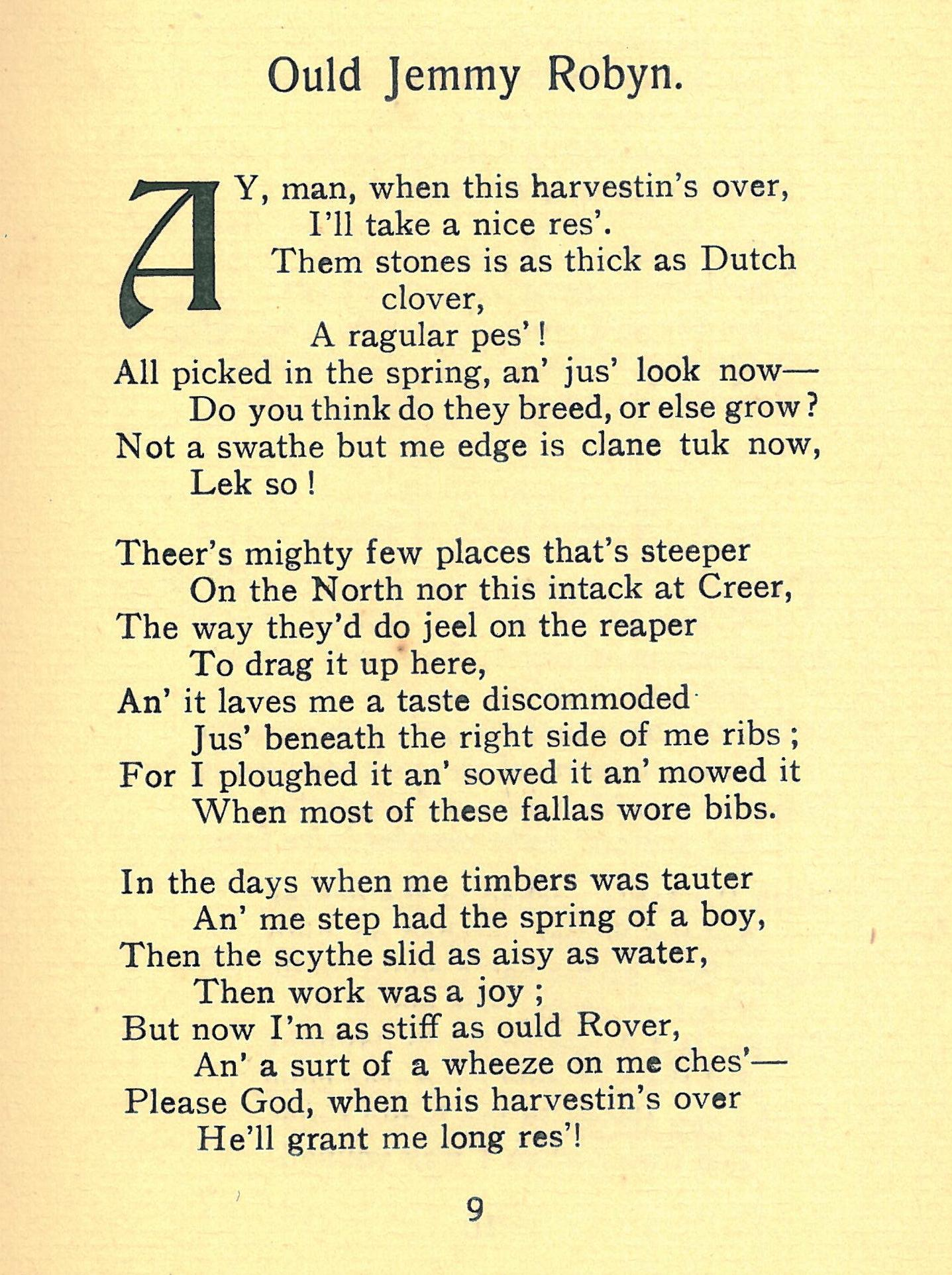
'Ould Jemmy Robyn', as it appeared in Juan-y-Pherick's Journey

One of the best remembered poems from this collection today is 'Boaldyn':

Of all the countries under the sun,
Their crowns and treasures and ships at sea,
Take your pick of them one by one,
Only leave, when your choosing's done,
Mannin for me, Mannin for me.
Of all the parishes in that isle,
Their heads in the mountains, feet in the sea,
A friendly cottage in every mile,
And every face with a friendly smile
Braddan for me, Braddan for me.
Of all the villages in those parishes,
Smouldering snug by river or sea,
In valleys the soft wind cherishes, nourishes,
Where the last of the old life flourishes-
Boaldyn for me, Boaldyn for me!

Writing shortly after Gill's death, Mona Douglas was to comment on him that: "Our Manx literature is too small in bulk, and too uneven in quality, for us to miss claiming full recognition for a writer who was, perhaps, the finest Manx poet of our generation." Three further poems by Gill that had not featured in Juan-y-Pherick’s Journey were published posthumously in 1972 in the first edition of the journal, Manninagh, edited by Mona Douglas.

Following his return from the war, Gill became a vice-president of the Manx Society in 1918. He worked for a time in the Douglas Employment Exchange alongside his friend and the eventual Director of The Manx Museum, William Cubbon. In 1922, when the Manx Museum was created and Cubbon was appointed its first librarian, Gill assisted him in a voluntary capacity in collating and arranging the manuscripts. At this time Gill was registered as living at Ballaquane Cottage, Dalby.

== The Manx Scrapbooks ==
In 1929 Gill's A Manx Scrapbook was published to great acclaim. It was a collection of traditional names and folklore associated with places in the Isle of Man. The sections included well names and well lore, coast names of Rushen, and place names and place lore. Gill explained the cultural importance of such a seemingly obscure collection in his preface, explaining that the book included:

"a number of little known and mostly obsolescent place-names, which, though they are a department of philology from one point of view, from another epitomize many of the motives of a bygone social life, not excepting its customs and superstitions."

The work of the book had been identified as an important task by A. W. Moore at the opening meeting of The Manx Society in 1899, but no sustained body of work had been carried out in the thirty years between then and the publication of Gill's book. By 1932 the task was all the more pressing due to the extremely endangered position of the Manx language at that time:

"Manx is not even losing ground, languishing, or on the verge of extinction. As a means of communication it is dead, and has been dead for a generation."

In 1932 was published Gill's A Second Manx Scrapbook, which covered second sight, divination, witchcraft, charms, fairies, folk-song and hunt the wren. This was followed in 1937 with a manuscript version of A Third Manx Scrapbook, which was concerned with personal names of the island, as well as some extra material covering similar ground to the second Scrapbook. This final volume was finally published in 1963 and was significantly shorter than the preceding two volumes; it was roughly 200 pages in length, in contrast to the first two volumes, each of which was around 500 pages.

== Other works ==
In 1934 he had published his work on Manx Dialect Words and Phrases, which he saw as an extension of the 1924 book, A Vocabulary of the Anglo-Manx Dialect, by A. W. Moore (completed posthumously by Sophia Morrison and Edmund Goodwin). In the preface Gill makes this clear by stating of his book that "all it contains is meant to be supplementary to that work. Any expression not found in the one may be looked for in the other with some hope of success."

For a time Gill was joint editor of the Journal of the Manx Museum and in the 1940s he was editor of the Proceedings of the Isle of Man Natural History and Antiquarian Society. In February 1963 he was awarded the Mananan Trophy for his outstanding contribution to Manx culture.

Gill was also the author of a number of Anglo-Manx dialect plays, at least one of which was produced. The Visitors was produced by Aeglagh Cloie.

Towards the end of his life his home was in Glentramman, Lezayre. It was here that he died on New Year's Eve in 1963, aged 87.
