= Mona Douglas =

Manx cultural activist and writer

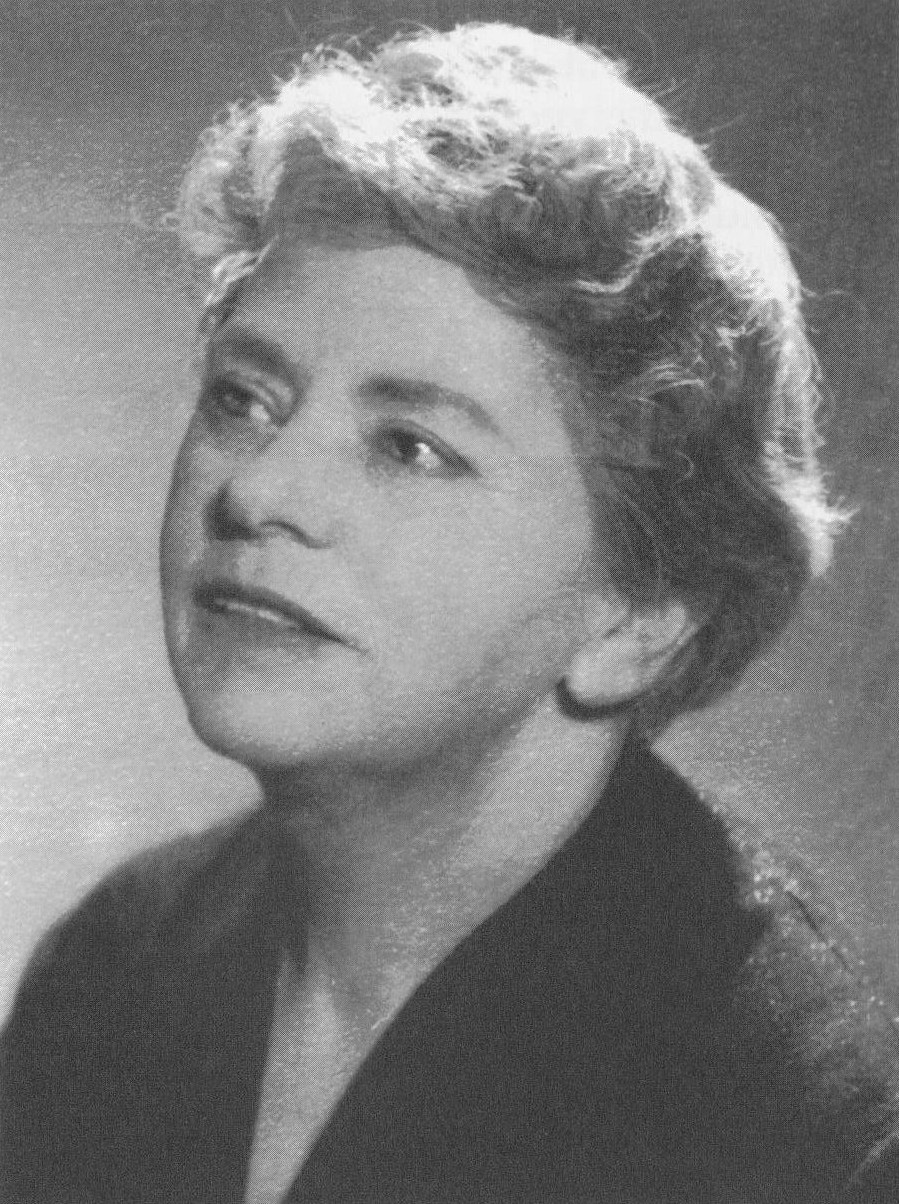
- Born: Constance Mona Douglas; 18 September 1898; Much Woolton
- Died: 8 October 1987 (aged 89); Nobles Hospital, Isle of Man
- Occupations: Librarian and Journalist
- Writing career
- Genres: Poetry, songs, folklore, drama, novels, journalism

Signature
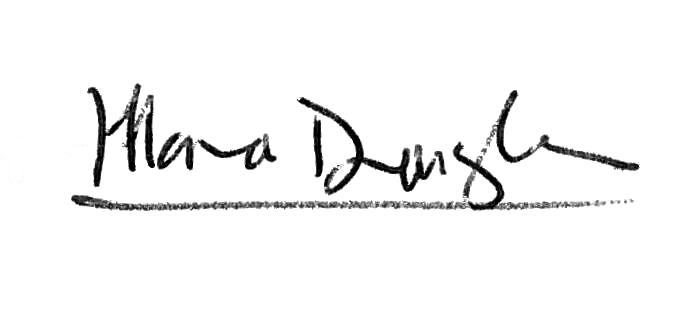

Mona Douglas MBE RBV (18 September 1898 – 8 October 1987) was a Manx cultural activist, folklorist, poet, novelist and journalist. She is recognised as the main driving force behind the modern revival of Manx culture and is acknowledged as the most influential Manx poet of the 20th century, but she is best known for her often controversial work to preserve and revive traditional Manx folk music and dance. She was involved in a great number of initiatives to revive interest and activity in Manx culture, including societies, classes, publications and youth groups. The most notable and successful of these was Yn Chruinnaght.

== Childhood ==
Constance Mona Douglas (Connie) was born on 18 September 1898 at 49 Allerton Road, Much Woolton, Lancashire (now Merseyside). She was the daughter of Manx parents, Frank Beardman Douglas (1863–1943) and Frances Mona (née Holmes - born London, Ontario, Canada of Manx parents) (1873–1953). Her parents had left the Isle of Man to find work in England, eventually setting up a bakery and confectioners in Birkenhead.

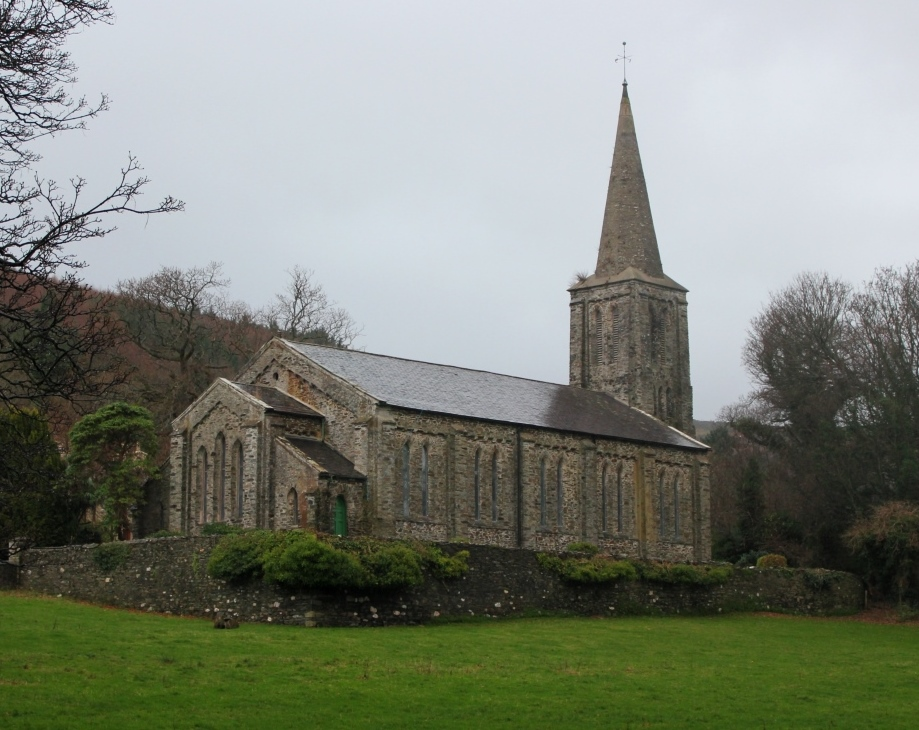
Lezayre church

Because of ill health, Douglas was sent to live with her maternal grandparents, Ellen "Nell" Quayle and Patrick "Pat" Holmes (listed as Thomas in the 1901 Census) when only a matter of months old. Her grandmother would influence her greatly through her knowledge of Manx folklore, song and dance. Her childhood was spent in the vicinity of Lezayre, and later Ballaragh near Laxey, where she received a very free and informal upbringing: "I never went to school and I used to just go round Ballaragh with the farmers and down to Laxey and went out in the boats with the fishermen, and wandering about pretty well as I liked."

Music was a central part of Douglas' upbringing, most notably through the musical evenings which took place at her parents' house when she visited them. Both of her parents were musical: her father played the violin and flute, and her mother played the piano and sang; and they were both members of a choral society. On Sunday evenings, from when Douglas was six years old, a number of other cultured people from the community would gather at their house "for poetry readings, discussion and music". Through this she gained a knowledge of "the great English and American poets" and the music of Handel, Bach, Beethoven, Schubert, Liszt, Chopin, Puccini and Verdi. Some Manx music also featured:

"We knew little of folksong, but the Manx National Songs were often sung and played, and it was about this time, I think, that I first became conscious of my Manx nationality, and felt the first stirrings of that passionate love for the Island and all things Manx which has been with me ever since."

Douglas received a copy of Grimms' Fairy Tales aged four, obtained a public library ticket aged five and received her first collection of poetry aged seven (Robert Louis Stevenson's A Child's Garden of Verses). She took up writing poetry at this age, commenting later that "soon I began to spend my pennies on pencils and exercise-books instead of sweets and ice-cream."

During the holiday periods, Douglas would visit her aunt and uncle in Douglas. At the age of nine her visit coincided with the Eisteddfod of 1908, and she submitted her poem, Douglas Bay, into the competition. When it won first prize, she came to the attention of Sophia Morrison, W. Walter Gill and William Cubbon, whom she later described as "the strongest influences in determining the trend of my subsequent literary work. [...] I have no adequate words to express my grateful consciousness of the help and guidance given to me in my formative years by these three good friends." Sophia Morrison was responsible for setting Douglas on the task of collecting folklore, song, music and dance:

"[...] when she found the kind of life I was living she started me collecting, putting things down. She didn't call it collecting then. She said, 'You know, you ought to write down some of these things that people tell you and sing to you.' And she gave me a little notebook in which I started to write things down and I still have."

Douglas also began to publish her poetry at this time, submitting poems to and often winning competitions in publications such as The Girl's Realm, Lady's Pictorial, The Lady and The Gentlewoman. Her poetry took a stylistic shift in 1908 when she discovered the writing of W. B. Yeats, who would influence her writing for the rest of her life.

== Youth ==
By May 1915 Douglas had moved back to her parents in Birkenhead. From here she studied at the Liverpool School of Art for two years whilst at the same time taking private lessons in violin, piano, singing and music theory from people associated with the Liverpool Philharmonic. With the start of World War I, she started work in her parents' bakery to replace a man who had gone to war.

Whilst in England, at the age of sixteen, Douglas had her first collection of poetry published; Manx Song and Maiden Song, published under a London imprint of Erskine Macdonald in 1915. Some of this collection of 26 poems had been written when she was only fourteen. Besides the numerous poems depicting the Manx landscape and sea, one notable poem was entitled 'T. E. Brown: a memorial sonnet to the poet of Manxland.' P. W. Caine reviewed the collection, commenting that: "This little book of lyrics is full of beauty and charm. The sound of the sea, the scent of gorse and the silence of the mountains pervade it." Her poem, 'Two Twilights', illustrates both the style of her verse and also the mystical tone that pervades it:

Over the wild waves comes the call of the great spaces;
White breakers leap from a plain of silver-grey—
Dreaming lies the world, but the reckless sea still moveth,
In the mystic hour of twilight, at the dawning of the day.

In 1916 Douglas took up Manx Gaelic lessons, writing by the end of November that "I am still keeping up my efforts to learn [Manx] & go over to Kennish's nearly every week for a 'lesson'. It is slow work, but someday I hope to acquire a perfect mastery – at any rate that is my aim." She did become fluent in Manx, coming to teach and write poetry in it over the coming decade.

Douglas' second poetry book, Mychurachan, was published in 1917. This collection of 40 poems derived its name from the Manx for driftwood or jetsam – mooirchooraghyn. In recognition of Douglas' poetry up to this point she was invested as a Bard of the Third Degree in the Order of Gorsedds at the Royal Eisteddfod of Wales, and given the bardic name of 'Mona Manaw' ("Mona of Man").

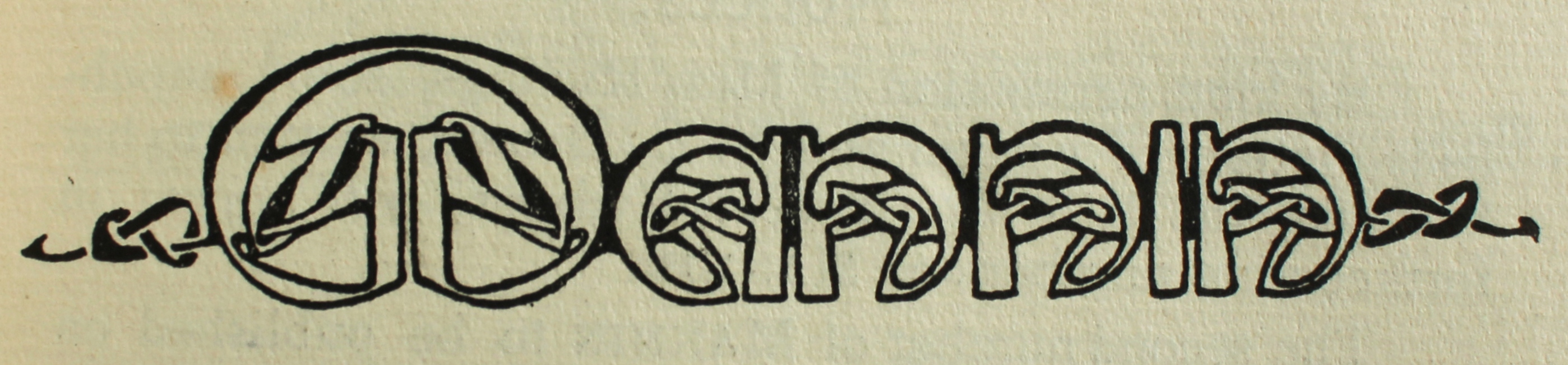
The title of the journal, Mannin, designed by Archibald Knox

As a result of the death of Douglas' friend and mentor, Sophia Morrison, in January 1917, Douglas was elected Secretary of the leading cultural body of the Isle of Man at that time, Yn Çheshaght Ghailckagh (The Manx Language Society). Then aged only 18, the notice of Douglas' appointment stated that: "Miss Douglas is still very young, but the achievement of her youth is already such as to give the most glowing promise [...] Miss Douglas has leisure, she has enthusiasm, and those who are acquainted with her are confident that she has judgment."

In the wake of Morrison's death, Douglas also stepped in to edit the final edition of the journal Mannin, to which she contributed a poem of her own in memory of Morrison. Douglas had earlier contributed folklore notes to previous editions of the journal, including her first published piece on folklore.

Through her position as Secretary of Yn Çheshaght Ghailckagh, Douglas also became the Secretary of the Manx branch of the Celtic Congress. In this capacity she attended the Celtic Congress of 1917, where she met Alfred Perceval Graves. He and others of the Pan-Celtic movement made a large and lasting impact on her: "my association with a number of national personalities convinced me firmly that the goal of nationalists in all the Celtic countries should be, eventually, an independent federation of the Celtic States." This Pan-Celtic fervour emerged in her third collection of poetry, A Dhooragh, published in 1919. The poem placed first in that collection showed clearly Douglas' "open sympathy" for the Irish Easter Rising of 1916:

Kinsmen of the shining west!
Your unrest wild hearts have shared:
Soon from our land, too, shall rise,
Through wild skies, a singing bird.

Douglas' avid interest in the Celtic Movement in Ireland was deepened when she visited Dublin in 1921 at the invitation of Professor Agnes O'Farrelly of University College Dublin, who she had probably met at the Celtic Congress four years earlier. Whilst staying with O'Farrelly in Rathgar, Douglas took a short course in Irish Literature; she also studied a course in librarianism, with the intention of getting a job at the Library of the Manx Museum, which was to open in 1922. However no such job materialised. Whilst in Dublin, Douglas met George Russell, who influenced and encouraged her interest in Manannan, as well as seeing W. B. Yeats whilst visiting the Abbey Theatre.

Four Manx Plays was published in 1921, a collection of three plays by Douglas and one by J. J. Kneen. Douglas' plays, 'The Faery Tune', 'The Lips of the Sea' and 'Churning', were written in the Manx English dialect and were generally rural-based comic plays. Upon seeing the first of these plays in 1916, Sophia Morrison had explained to a friend that: "Miss Douglas' idea is to shew the inherent mysticism of the people, & the strange mingling of the old faith & the new which one finds among the older people, & those who live up among the hills – they use Christianity vaguely as a sort of charm, while really possessing a strong belief in the old fairy powers!" By 1924 all of the plays had all been produced "with great acceptance."

== Life in the UK ==
In 1925 Douglas moved to Harlech, Wales, to work as secretary to the poet Alfred Perceval Graves (the father of Robert Graves), while he wrote his autobiography, To Return to All That. Graves then encouraged Douglas to go to London to broaden her horizons.

In London Douglas worked for around three years as a freelance journalist and even for a time for a producer at the Elstree Film Studios. While in London, Douglas continued to strengthen her ties with the English Folk Dance Society, contributing tunes, songs and commentaries to A. G. Gilchrist's three volumes of the Society's Folksong Journal which were dedicated to Manx music, published between 1924 and 1926.

Douglas collaborated with Arnold Foster, a pupil of Vaughan Williams, on a set of arrangements of twelve Manx songs, published by Stainer & Bell in 1928. This was to be the first of three such publications, the others appearing in 1929 and 1957, each containing twelve songs. Further to the 36 songs published in these collections, a number of further songs remained unpublished during her lifetime. However, from the total of 46 songs that Douglas claimed to have collected, it has been comprehensively argued that 21 of these were "composed songs of one sort or another" that originated with Douglas herself.

In 1929 Douglas contributed folklore connected to wells in Lonan to W. Walter Gill's seminal work, A Manx Scrapbook.

== Return to the Isle of Man ==
In 1929 the English Folk Dance Society held its Easter Vacation School on the Isle of Man. Assuming that no Manx folk dance had survived into the modern day, the Society asked Douglas instead to talk to them on local folk song. However, Douglas was able to pull together various notes on Manx dance into a form fit to be presented to the Society. Through the assistance of teachers and pupils at Albert Road School in Ramsey, Douglas was able to have three of these reconstructed dances performed: 'The Manx Dirk Dance', 'Hyndaa yn Bwoailley' and 'Eunyssagh Vona'.

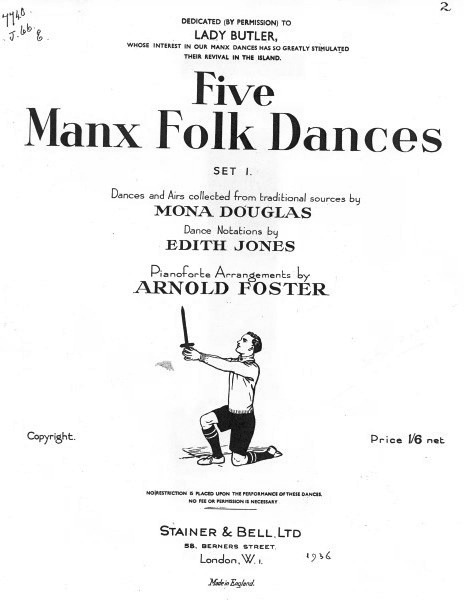
Five Manx Folk Dances illustrated with an image of the final position of the Manx Dirk Dance

The dances proved to be a great success, resulting in an invitation for one of the boys, Billy Caine, to perform the subsequently controversial Manx dirk dance at the All-England Festival at the Royal Albert Hall the following summer. Douglas reported that, "The Ramsey schoolboy and his wonderful dance were the sensation of the Festival, and received special notices in all the big London papers." Children from the school were also invited to perform other Manx dances at the festival in the following years.

Inspired by this success, Douglas then set about collecting, "re-building" and "re-constructing" all she could of Manx folk dance. Again in collaboration with Arnold Foster, Douglas published two volumes of Manx dances, in 1936 and 1953. The twelve "virile and characteristic dances" collected in these volumes, the thirteen new dances that would appear in 1983 in Rinkaghyn Vannin and the incomplete notes on some others amounted to 29 dances in total. These Douglas considered to be the sum total of "all the surviving Manx traditional dances."

Controversy surrounds the authenticity of Douglas' folk collecting, particularly of folk song and dance. Although there is no doubt that she did much collecting, there is also little doubt that she invented or herself composed much of this material. Douglas' fabrication of much material is partly explained by her ultimate aim being to repopularise Manx culture rather than its mere preservation. This is one of the key themes and successes of Douglas' life and work, as expressed in her reaction to the reception of these early dance reconstructions:

"I am pleased that the English Folk Dance Society finds them interesting, and grateful for the help and encouragement given me by certain of its members, but the main point of my work will have been missed unless the Manx themselves claim and use their heritage of national dance, which is as truly a part of national culture as its music or history."

It was with this revitalisation of Manx culture in mind that Douglas set up Aeglagh Vannin ("the Youth of Mann") in 1931. The group held weekly after-school meetings at Albert Road School in Ramsey, "for the study of Celtic literature and Manx traditional dance," as well as for the learning of Manx Gaelic and involvement in other Manx cultural and environmental activities. By 1934 the organisation had adopted the motto, Piatchyn jiu, ashoon mairagh ("Children today, a nation tomorrow"), and a song composed for them by Douglas:

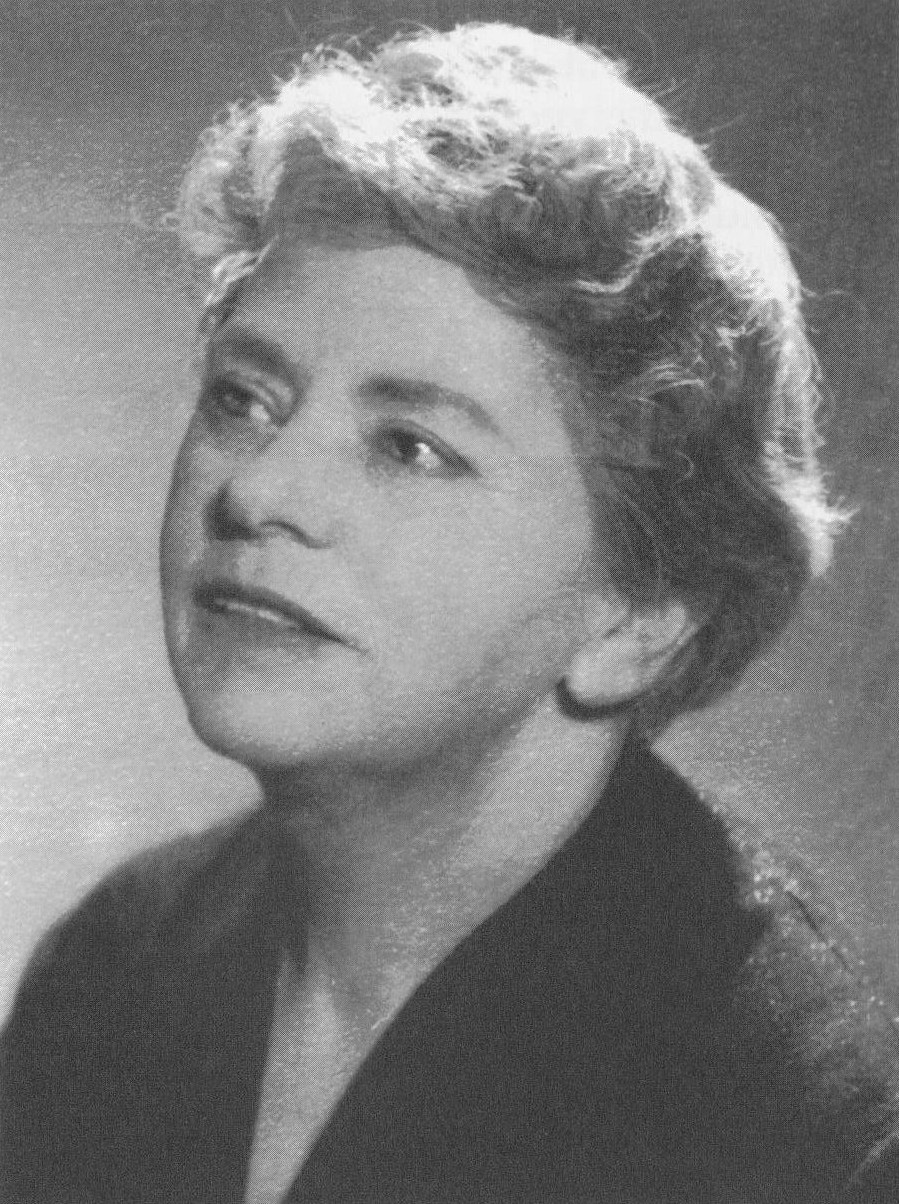

O Land of our allegiance
O Mannin of the sea!
May we be ever worthy
To claim our share in thee!
We hold thy soil as sacred
And though we journey far,
They flame of song and story
Burns where thy children are.

The organisation had significant success in establishing and raising the profile of Manx folk dance, most notably through appearances on Irish television and radio. However, after periodic lulls of interest, the organisation petered out some time after 1976.

Following Douglas' training as a librarian while in Dublin in 1921, she was appointed Rural Librarian under the Department of Education in 1933, where she worked for the next 30 years.

Following proposals made in the 1934 annual meeting of The Manx Society, Douglas published a series of weekly Manx lessons in the Mona's Herald newspaper during the spring of 1935. These were printed in book form as Beginning Manx Gaelic: A Manx Primer in 1935, and Lessons in Manx in 1936. Both of these were based on Goodwin's 1901 book, First Lessons in Manx. This and other of Douglas' efforts demonstrate her belief that Manx Gaelic was a central part of Manx culture that needed to be revitalised:

"the salvation of the Manx people, like that of the language, lies with themselves. At present things look rather black for both of these; but personally I believe in them both: I believe that the Manx people will yet work out their economic solution, & that sometime sooner or later, they will awake to the beauty of their neglected language, & turn to it again with a rush of appreciation & true national feeling. Till then I am content to wait, & work as best I can for Ellan Vannin."

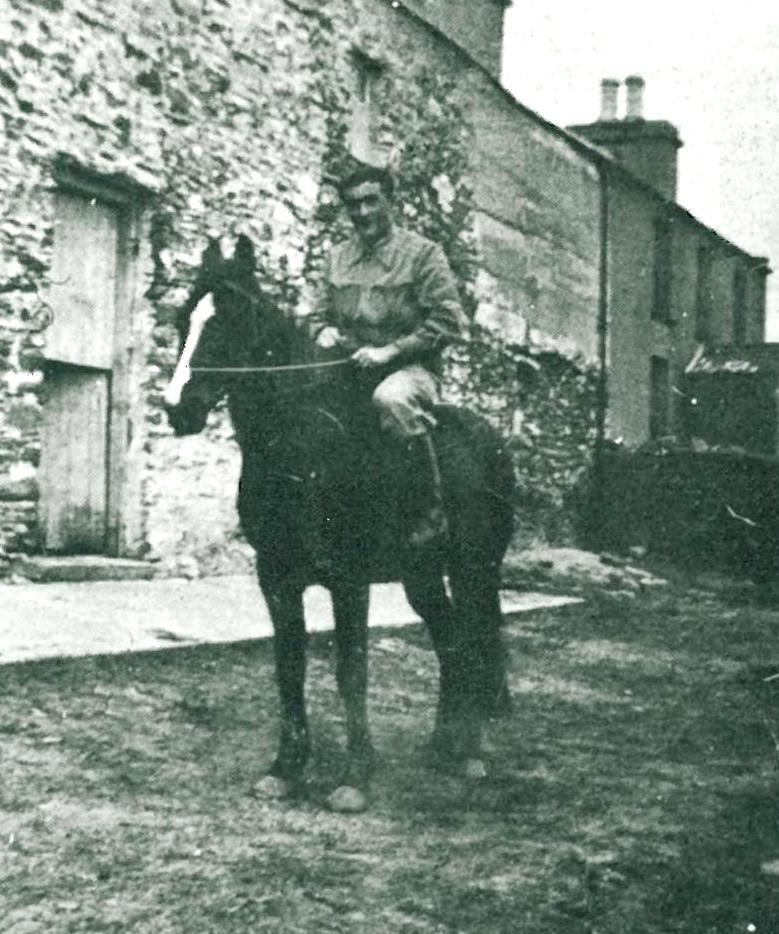
Leonida Nikolai Giovannelli

With the start of World War II, the Isle of Man was chosen as a base for internment camps for enemy aliens. After a short time the rules of detention were relaxed for those internees who posed no threat to the Allies, enabling them to be utilised for work in local Manx farms. Posted to the Douglas' family farm at Ballaragh were a party of Italians from a camp on the promenade at Douglas, amongst them Leonida Nikolai Giovannelli. After Giovannelli's eventual release from internment, he and Douglas ran an experimental upland farm at the Clarum, close to Douglas' parents' farm. After six years of operation, the farm had to be sold to meet rising debts in 1949. This part of their lives was recorded in Giovannelli's books, Experiments on a Manx Hill Farm (1956) and Exile on an Island (1969). By this time Douglas' father had died and when her mother also passed on, in 1953, she inherited 'Thie ny Garee', and she would later expand this to also run the Clarum.

Douglas' The Secret Island: Poems and Plays in Verse was published in 1943. In the foreword to the book Douglas explained that the title referred to "a place of being known to all mystics and spoken of, though by different names, in all the sacred books of the world: that region of ecstasy on the brink of the final, formless Deep which is the source of all things." Douglas' next book, Islanders, her only short story collection, was published in 1944 with Giovannelli as the dedicatee. Some of the stories in this collection were re-writes of her plays published in 1921. The heavy influence of Celtic Mysticism on some of these stories can be seen in 'A Son Comes Home', later to be reproduced in Manninagh:

"He realised that the secret magic of heredity had stirred within him [...] evoking a fragment of that racial past of which our transitory lives are built, which dwells ever invisibly within us, hidden in the intertices of time and space save when some rare combination of mood and circumstance restores it to a fleeting renewal of consciousness in living experience."

In 1956 Douglas' sixth and final collection of poetry, Island Magic, was published. The pamphlet was only 19 pages in length.

== Later years ==
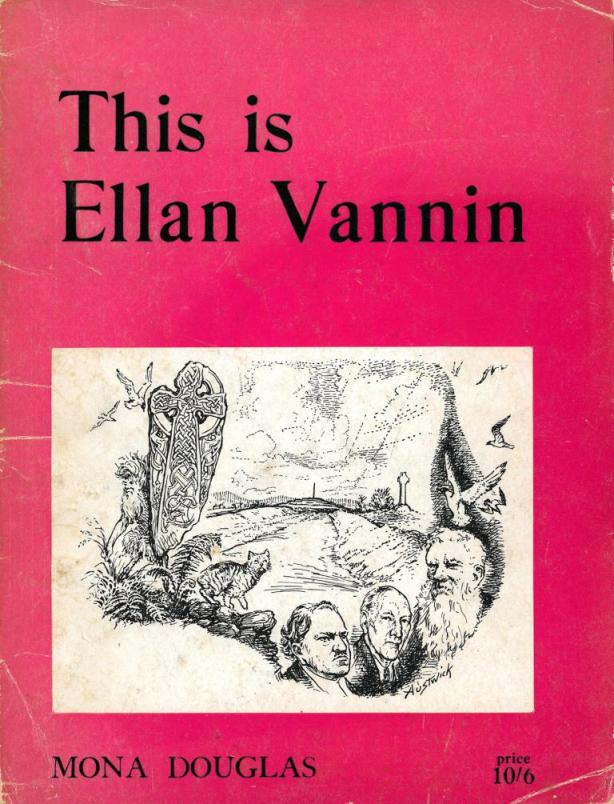
This is Ellan Vannin

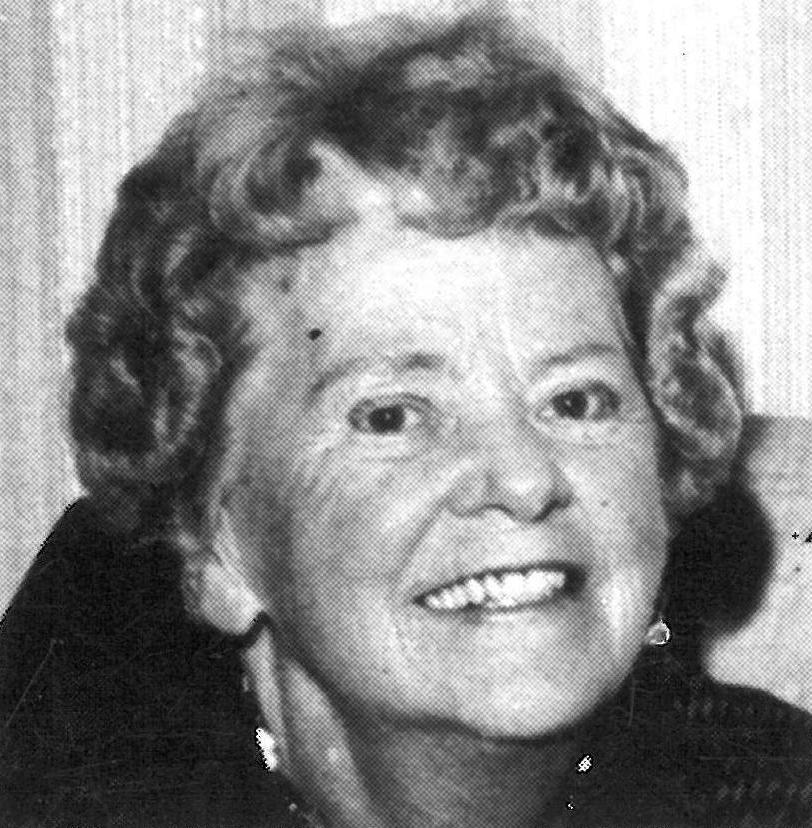
Douglas circa 1981

After retiring from her job as rural librarian at the age of 65, Douglas joined the staff of the Isle of Man Times as a reporter and feature-writer in 1963. Her writings for the Manx newspapers focussed on Manx culture and history and these articles were brought together in a series of five books: This is Ellan Vannin (1965), Christian Tradition in Vannin (1965), This is Ellan Vannin Again: Folklore (1966), They Lived in Ellan Vannin (1968) and We Call it Ellan Vannin (1970).

Douglas founded and edited a cultural journal, Manninagh ("Manxman"). The first edition was published in May 1972 and ranged over a wide field of cultural interests, including Manx theatre, art, crafts, literature, poetry (in English & Gaelic), folklore, banking, farming, fishing, genealogy and conservation. Contributors to this and subsequent editions included a number of important Manx figures of the day, including Charles Kerruish, W. Walter Gill, Leonida Nikolai Giovanelli, Douglas Faragher, Constance Radcliffe and Nancy Gaffikin. Douglas made her intention for the journal clear in her preface to the first edition:

"Manninagh [...] is intended to provide a channel for the expression of Manx cultural interests in various fields, especially for original work in the arts in the Manx tradition; and it is hoped that it may come to be regarded as a not unworthy successor to such journals as Mannin and The Manx Notebook"

However, there was insufficient interest in such a cultural journal to enable Manninagh to go beyond three editions, the last of which was published in 1973. More successful was The Manxman, a lighter publication, which Douglas edited for thirteen editions between 1971 and 1978.

In 1976 Douglas published a novel, Song of Mannin, illustrated by Paul Austwick. The novel was set in the 1790s and formed a fictional background to the well-known Manx song, Ny Kirree fo Niaghtey ("The Sheep Under the Snow"). This was followed in 1981 with Douglas' sequel, Rallying Song, which follows an American woman who returns to the Manx home of her great-father and reconnects with the Celtic spirit of the country and its people. Both books display Douglas' ethnic essentialism – "the life-long passion of Mona Douglas for race, blood and tradition." Rallying Song proved to be "more controversial and overtly nationalist" than its predecessor.

In 1977, Douglas organised the first meeting of Yn Chruinnaght. Under the title of "Feailley Vanninagh Rhumsaa" ("Ramsey Manx Festival") and in collaboration with the Ellynyn ny Gael ("Arts of the Gaels") organisation, this was a one-day Manx Gaelic culture event held on 1 September. The following year it expanded into a five-day inter-Celtic festival, giving an opportunity for the six Celtic nations of the Isle of Man, Brittany, Ireland, Scotland, Wales and Cornwall to participate. Yn Chruinnaght has since received official recognition from Oireachtas na Gaeilge in Ireland, Yr Orsedd y Beirdd and Yr Eisteddfod Genedlaethol in Wales and An Mod in Scotland. The festival is still going strong today and attracts large attendances annually from across the Celtic nations and beyond. It has been described as the "climax" of the second wave of the Manx cultural revival between 1920 and 1980.

In 1982, Douglas received an MBE, awarded for her outstanding services to Manx culture. This was followed in 1987 with the honour of White Druidic Order, the highest award that the Gorsedd could bestow.

== Death ==
Just before Christmas 1986 Douglas fell and broke her leg but, in spite of her friends' urgings, she refused to move from her remote cottage. However, within months she had to return to Noble's Hospital, where she died peacefully on 8 October 1987 at the age of 89. She was cremated in Douglas a few days later.

== Legacy ==
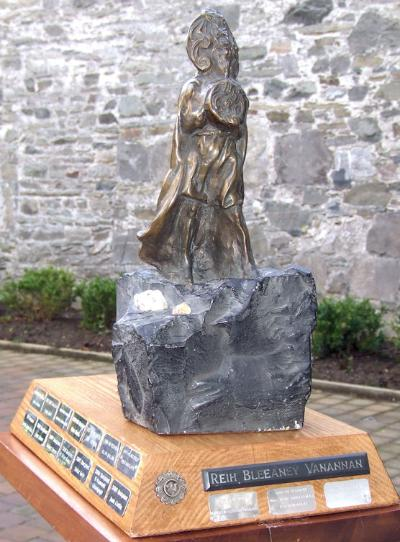
The Reih Bleeaney Vanannan Trophy

The estimation of Douglas at the end of her life was immediately shown through a series of memorial services and concerts that followed in the months after her death. This was followed in 1988 with the posthumous awarding of the Reih Bleeaney Vanannan award for outstanding contributions to Manx culture.

Numerous recent publications have been made on Douglas' life and work, notably Mona Douglas: A Tribute edited by Fenella Bazin in 1998 and "Restoring to use our almost-forgotten dances": The collection and revival of Manx folk song and dance edited by Stephen Miller in 2004, the extended proceedings of a one-day conference held in Douglas in April 2000.

In recognition of their lasting national importance, Douglas' papers had been deposited with the archives of the Manx National Heritage Library at her death. These were an unsorted and uncatalogued collection of "everything from bank statements and bills to original manuscripts and unpublished works," until Autumn 2003 when a Culture Vannin grant enabled Dr Breesha Maddrell "to sift through them, collate them and then make a detailed assessment of their value and content."

Also in 2003, Douglas' 1944 book, Islanders, featured on a Manx stamp. This was as a part of The Manx Bookshelf series of six stamps released by the Isle of Man Post Office to celebrate works of fiction associated with the Isle of Man. Other writers featured included Agatha Christie, Hall Caine and Nigel Kneale.

In 2012, the 25th anniversary of Douglas' death was marked with a series of events on the Isle of Man, including a special concert of songs and dances held in Peel and recorded for subsequent release on DVD and CD, and a talk on her life and work in Ramsey.

In 2017 a CD/DVD inspired by the work of Mona Douglas was released by Culture Vannin. Mona's Isle: The Legacy of Mona Douglas featured many leading contemporary Manx musicians, including Aalin Clague, Annie Kissack, Bob Carswell, Breesha Maddrell, Clare Kilgallon, Dave Kilgallon, Dave Mclean, Greg Joughin and Mandy Griffin. Two of Douglas' previously unpublished plays were also released in 2017, having been discovered within the archive of Manx dialect plays held by The Michael Players. The plays, The Widow's House and The Anniversary, were published to coincide with the 30th anniversary of her death on 8 October 2017.

Although Douglas is recognised as the "most influential" Manx poet of the 20th century, interest in her writings has waned since her death. Today she is best remembered for her work to reinvigorate and reignite interest in Manx culture, particularly with regards to Manx music and dance, such as through Yn Chruinnaght. Douglas' "extraordinary stamina" was all the more remarkable in that she was forced to work "tirelessly against the tide of public opinion which saw little value in what she was doing." Douglas' resilience can perhaps be attributed to her basic love of the Isle of Man, as she expressed in many ways during her life:

"But behind all the rest, for me, is always the beauty and mystery and glory of our own Sacred Island, Ellan Vannin in the heart which is for ever our Mother and Queen to be adored and served, the ideal to be kept inviolate for those who shall follow us, and so handed on: our inspiration, and our ultimate rest – Ellan Vannin dy bragh!"

== Publications ==
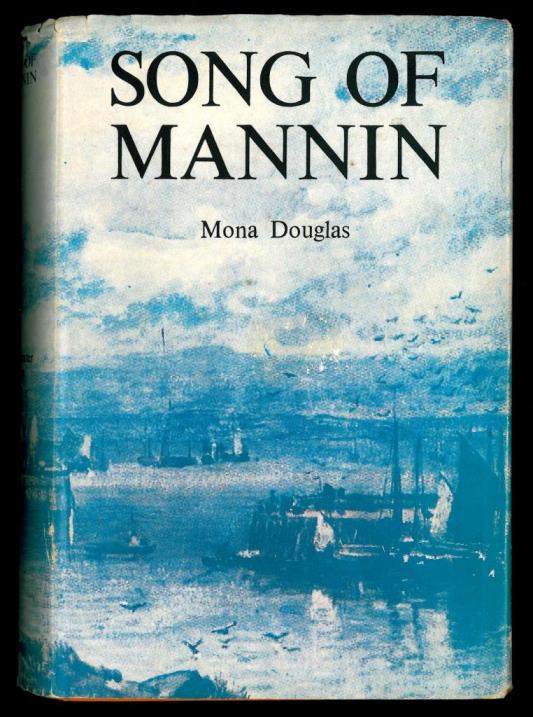
Mona Douglas' 1976 novel, Song of Mannin

- Manx Song and Maiden Song. London: The William Morrison Press, Ltd. 1915.
- Mychurachan. London: John Lang. 1917.
- A Dhooragh. Douglas: Clucas & Fargher. 1919.
- Four Manx Plays. Douglas: Yn Çheshaght Ghailckagh. 1921. (Co-authored with J. J. Kneen)
- A Manx Primer. Douglas: Yn Çheshaght Ghailckagh. 1935.
- The Island Spirit. 1937.
- The Secret Island: Poems and Plays in Verse. Douglas: Victoria Press. 1943.
- Islanders: A Collection of Manx Stories. 1944.
- Magic Island. 1956.
- Christian Tradition in Mannin. Douglas: Times Longbooks. 1965.
- This is Ellan Vannin: a Miscellany of Manx Life and Lore. Douglas: Times Longbooks. 1965.
- This is Ellan Vannin Again: Folklore. Douglas: Times Press. 1966.
- They Lived in Ellan Vannin. Douglas: Times Press. 1968.
- We Call it Ellan Vannin. Douglas: Times Press. 1970.
- Song of Mannin. Douglas: Shearwater Press, Ltd. 1976. ISBN 0904980065.
- Rallying Song. Peel: Mansk / Svenska Publishing Company. 1981. ISBN 0907715079.

== Awards ==
- Member of the Gorsedd of the Bards (Wales), 1917
- Manannan Trophy, 1972
- International President of the Celtic Congress, 1980
- MBE, awarded for outstanding services to Manx culture, 1982
- Appointed to the Principal Order of the Gorsedd, 1987
- Reih Bleeaney Vanannan (awarded posthumously), 1988
