= W. Clucas Kinley =

Manx journalist and playwright

William Clucas Kinley (1866–1920), Manx journalist and playwright.

William Clucas Kinley was born in 1866, the son of Robert Kinley, a tailor in Strand Street, Douglas, Isle of Man. He contributed humorous articles under the title 'Ingoldsby Up-to-date' to the weekly critical and satirical paper, The Manxman, which was published between 1895 and 1900. It was around this time that he became actively involved in the Labour movement, and also that he married Florence Mary Kinley, née Bawden, (1886–1927). In 1914 when World War I began, he volunteered for war duty on a minesweeper but was turned down due to his suffering from chronic bronchitis. By this time he was resident in Brockley, London, where he was a regular contributor to The Kentish Mercury, a paper edited by his brother-in-law, Stanley Kay Bawden. Kinley joined the editorial staff of the paper in 1916. He died from his chronic bronchitis on February 17, 1920, at his home at 40 Upper Brockley Road, at the age of 53. The funeral was at Brockley Cemetery on February 21, 1920.

Kinley was the author of the play, Ellie’s Stranger, first published in Mannin, the journal and the Manx Language Society, in November 1916. The play had earlier been submitted to the Manx Language Society competition organised by Sophia Morrison in 1913, but it was judged to come behind the plays of Christopher R. Shimmin and John Kneen, despite receiving special praise by Alfred Perceval Graves. The play, sub-titled ‘A Manx Domestic Comedy’, centres on the man Ellie Clague returns home to her highly traditional parents after some time staying with an aunt in the popular tourist destination of Douglas. It was produced on the Isle of Man in 1920, shortly after his death.
