= Josephine Kermode =

Manx poet and playwright (1852–1937)

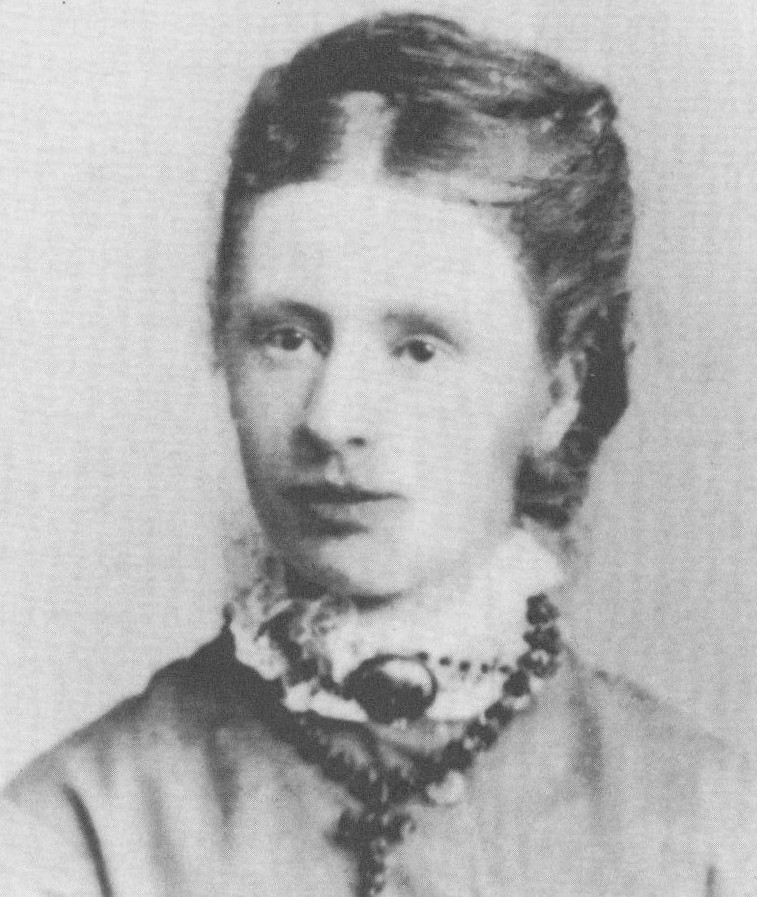
- "Cushag" at the age of around 22
- Born: Margaret Letitia Josephine Kermode; 18 September 1852; Ramsey, Isle of Man
- Died: 15 February 1937 (aged 84); Bournemouth, England

Margaret Letitia Josephine Kermode (18 September 1852 – 15 February 1937) was a Manx poet and playwright better known by the pen name "Cushag".

== Early life ==
Margaret Letitia Josephine Kermode was born on 18 September 1852, at 73 Parliament Street, Ramsey. She was one of seven children who lived beyond childhood to Rev William Kermode, and his second wife, Jane née Bishop, of Shelton Hall, Staffordshire. As well as being Chaplain of St. Paul's Church, Ramsey, Josephine Kermode's father was President of the Isle of Man Natural History and Antiquarian Society and he was to initiate a Parish Book for Ballaugh, in which he wrote a useful account of the antiquarian remains in the parish. He inspired devotion in his children and "a love of learning, a love of country and a love of service."

Cushag, as she came to be known, and her sisters were educated at home by a governess, while her brothers went to public school. She and the family moved around the north of the island as her father changed jobs, moving from St. Paul's in Ramsey to become, first, Vicar at Kirk Maughold (1871–1877) and then Rector of Ballaugh (1877–1890).

After her father's death in 1890, the family moved back to Ramsey, to Hillside on Vernon Road. Here Cushag took up a voluntary role as a District Nurse, until her health was adversely affected and she was obliged to stop. Eventually the family moved to the former home of Cushag's grandparents' in Claughbane, on the outskirts of Ramsey.

Cushag never married, and she acted as housekeeper for her brother P.M.C. Kermode from 1908, the year after his seminal work on the Manx Crosses was published.

P.M.C., as he was known, was an amateur archaeologist and historian at this time, whilst working full-time as Clerk to the Justices at Ramsey. Cushag was described as sharing with her brother "the same gentle kindliness and old-fashioned courtesy; proud, yet modest; sensitive and yet lovable." She respected P.M.C with the "reverence for a genius."

They lived in a secluded house in Glen Auldyn, with the river running through its garden and a meadow next to it for the grazing of their horse, Brownie.

== Poems by "Cushag", 1907 ==
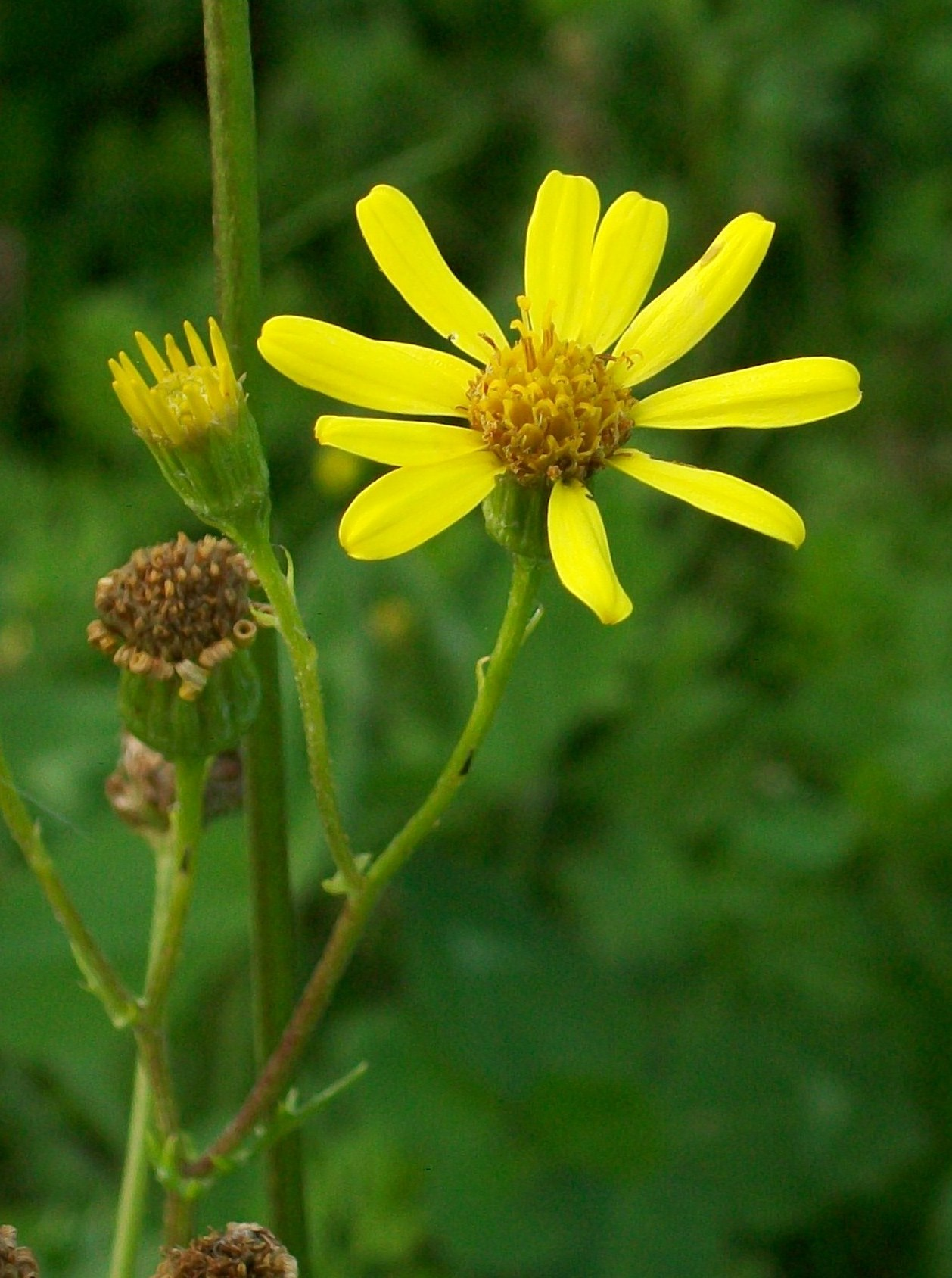
The Cushag, the national flower of the Isle of Man

Kermode's first published work was 'A Lonan Legend', in 1899. Her first collection of poems, Poems by "Cushag", was published in August 1907. It was at this time that she adopted the nom de plume, "Cushag", by which she then came to be universally known. The name comes from the Manx word for ragwort, the official flower of the Isle of Man. The collection featured a poem about the flower:

Now, the Cushag, we know,
Must never grow,
Where the farmer's work is done.
But along the rills,
In the heart of the hills,
The Cushag may shine like the sun.
Where the golden flowers,
Have fairy powers,
To gladden our hearts with their grace.
And in Vannin Veg Veen,
In the valleys green,
The Cushags have still a place.

The collection was well received on the island, which was at the time undergoing the blossoming of the Manx cultural revival, with much work on the island's culture being done in the wake of the poet and T. E. Brown and the novelist Hall Caine. The English press received Cushag's collection in a positive though reserved manner, as shown by a review in the Manchester City News:

“a modest little volume of seventy-two pages, contains some forty short poems, mostly tales in verse, in all of which the introspective temperament so characteristic of the Manx people, with its resultant note of sadness, is well reflected. While not soaring to empyrean heights, “Cushag,” in pleasing rhyme and varied measure, sings of the love, the longing, the parting, and the griefs of the Islanders, heightened here and there with homely philosophy, or tinged with the superstition still lingering in the scattered hamlets or lonely farmhouses of Ellan Vannin. The dialect verse, in which most of the poems are written, presents an almost insuperable obstacle to English readers, but if this difficulty can be surmounted, there is in the volume ample reward for the trouble involved"

== Theatre ==
In 1908 Cushag published Peel Plays, a collection of three short plays: ‘Rosy Basins’, ‘The Lazy Wife’ and ‘Eunys (or the Dalby Maid)’. They were produced in Peel by The Peel Players thanks to Sophia Morrison. The plays show Cushag's deep interest in Manx folklore, as they are stage re-workings of various folk tales. Written in the Anglo-Manx dialect and with a realist tone, the plays are a clear defence of the Manx folk heritage against the encroachment of modern scientific rationalism. This is shown most clearly in 'Eunys (or the Dalby Maid)', where the foundling daughter returns to her fairy family to escape the unjust and destructive influence of the progressive English priest. The plays focus on women, children and family and so stand out in Manx literature, which was, at that time, otherwise dominated by traditional male types.

She wrote other plays, including the collection, Glen Aldyn Plays, which included the play, 'The Christmas Pudding', which was performed in 1915 in Glen Auldyn by the theatre group, the Glen people. Kermode's longer dramas include 'Mylecharaine' and 'The Quakers of Ballafayle'.

== Folklore ==
Cushag was also involved in the collection of Manx folklore. This was particularly encouraged through her friendship with Sophia Morrison. Having first met in 1907, they soon became good friends and Cushag would accompany Morrison on field trips to collect folklore. Cushag was especially useful in this respect as she was a fluent Manx speaker, having been brought up with the language from her childhood. Her fluency in Manx also gave birth to at least one piece of literature, a folk story in Manx Gaelic entitled Harry-Crab as yn Mob-beg, published in 1913. Although her role with Morrison was mainly as a companion in her folklore collecting, Cushag also contributed a number of short folklore pieces as "Folklore Notes" in the publication, Mannin. Upon Morrison's death at the age of 57 in January 1917, Cushag dedicated a poem to her memory in the final edition of Mannin, which came out in May of that year.

== Ellan Vannin and Manx Melodies ==
In 1911 came Cushag's second collection of poems, Ellan Vannin. In 1913 she had a large number of her poems collected in A Book of Manx Poetry, edited by William Cubbon, an anthology covering the entire history of poetry from the Isle of Man. She had various individual other poems published in places such as the Ramsey Courier, Mannin (the journal of the Manx Language Society, edited by Sophia Morrison) and Ellan Vannin (the magazine of the World Manx Association). Some of these poems were collected together with those of her prior two publications and some original pieces to make the 1922 book, Manx Melodies. One of her most notable poems from this collection is Traa-dy-Liooar. The title of the poem is a common Manx phase which translates into English as "time enough":

Traa-dy-Liooar

There's a wickad little falla that goes among us here,
An' the wickadness thass at him is tellin' far an' near;
He's prowlin' in the haggart an' in at every dhure,
An' coaxin' an' persuadin', an' his name is Traa-dy-Liooar.

The house is all through others, the childher's late for school,
The man is spendin' all his time in lookin' for a tool,
The wumman's tired thremendjus with clearin' up the flure,
An' the wan that's doin' all the jeel is wickad Traa-dy-Liooar.

The fields is full of cushag, the gates is darned with gorse,
You'll hardly see the harness for the mire upon the horse;
The cows is shoutin' shockin', an' puzzlin' them for sure,
Is the waitin' doin' on them at that tejus Traa-dy-Liooar.

There's a power of foes within us, and enemies without,
But the wan that houls the candle is that little lazy lout;
So just you take an' scutch him, an' put him to the dhure,
An' navar let him in again, that tejus Traa-dy-Liooar.

== Later life ==
It was in 1922, the year in which Manx Melodies was published, that Cushag moved with her brother to Douglas, the island's capital, when P.M.C. was appointed the first Curator of the newly formed Manx Museum. They first lived at Clifton House on Finch Road and then 6 Primrose Avenue. She remained in Douglas for the next ten years, until her brothers’ sudden death in 1932. Now aged 80, Cushag moved to live with her sister, Cherill, in Bournemouth where she died five years later on 15 February 1937. She is buried in Wimborne Road Cemetery, Bournemouth. A memorial stone also stands at Maughold Parish Churchyard, Isle of Man which was erected in 1944.

== Publications ==
- Poems by Cushag, Douglas: G & L Johnson, 1907, pp. 71 (available on ManxLiterature.im)
- Peel Plays, Douglas: G & L Johnson, 1908 (available on ManxLiterature.im)
- Granny: A Tale of Old Christmas, Douglas: G & L Johnson, 1910, pp. 23 (available on ManxLiterature.im)
- Ellan Vannin, Douglas: G. & L. Johnson, 1911 pp. 79 (available on ManxLiterature.im)
- Mylecharaine, Douglas: G. & L. Johnson, 1915, pp. 26 (available on ManxLiterature.im)
- Glen Aldyn Plays, Douglas: S. K. Broadbent, 1916, pp. 36 (available on ManxLiterature.im)
- The Glen, Ramsey: J. W. Strickett, 1919, pp. 12 (available on ManxLiterature.im)
- Manx Melodies, London: John Long, 1922. pp. 91 (available on ManxLiterature.im)
- The Quakers of Ballafayle, in Ramsey Courier, 24 September 1926. (available on ManxLiterature.im)
