= Arrane Ashoonagh dy Vannin =

National anthem of the Isle of Man

English: National Anthem of the Isle of Man
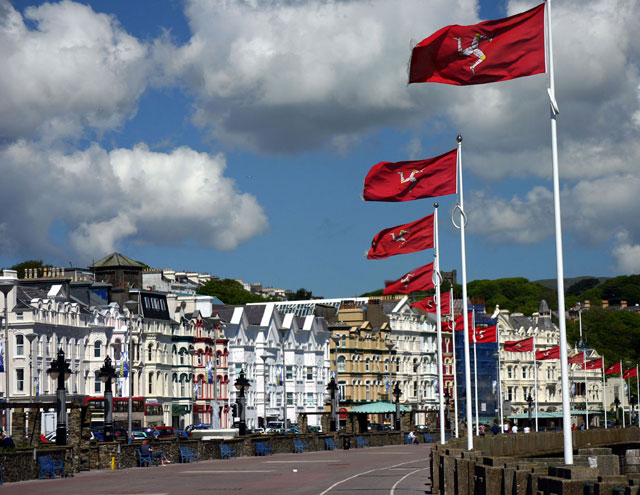
- National anthem of the Isle of Man
- Lyrics: William Henry Gill and John J. Kneen, 1907
- Music: William Henry Gill
- Adopted: 2003; 23 years ago

Audio sample
- Digital instrumental version: file; help

The "National Anthem of the Isle of Man" (Manx: Arrane Ashoonagh dy Vannin, [əraːnʲ əʒuːnəx vanənʲ]) was written and composed by William Henry Gill (1839–1923), with the Manx translation by John J. Kneen (1873–1939). It is often referred to by its incipit, "O Land of Our Birth" (Manx: O Halloo Nyn Ghooie, [oː haluː nən ɣu̯iː]).

== History ==
It is sung to an adaptation of the traditional Manx melody of "Mylecharaine’s March", which had been described as the "Manx national melody" long before Gill's composition. The words that originally accompanied the melody date to around 1800 and concern the impoverishment of a father to pay a dowry. However, those curious words have been identified as disparate pieces of older songs amalgamated together incompletely. The first verse of the song is: O Vylecharaine, c'raad hooar oo dty stoyr? / Nagh dooar mee 'sy Churragh eh dowin, dowin dy liooar? / My lomarcan daag oo mee (O Mylecharaine, where did you get your store? / Did I not get it in the Curragh, deep, deep enough? / Alone you left me).

First performed at the Manx Music Festival on 21 March 1907, there are eight verses in total in the modern anthem, but only the first verse is usually sung. The anthem was given official status by the Isle of Man's legislature, Tynwald, on 22 January 2003, with "God Save the King" being designated as the royal anthem. The National Anthem is used on official and ceremonial occasions and in schools; the Royal Anthem is normally reserved for use additionally on those occasions when the Sovereign, members of the Royal Family, or the Lieutenant Governor are present.

The traditional song "Ellan Vannin" ("Isle of Man") had up to that point vied to be an equal unofficial national anthem, and had been re-popularized by a 1997 Bee Gees recording of it released as a single.

== Lyrics ==
English lyrics

I
O land of our birth,
O gem of God's earth,
O Island so strong and so fair;
Built firm as Barrule,
Thy Throne of Home Rule
Makes us free as thy sweet mountain air.

II
When Orry, the Dane,
In Mannin did reign,
'Twas said he had come from above;
For wisdom from Heav'n
To him had been giv'n
To rule us with justice and love.

III
Our fathers have told
How Saints came of old,
Proclaiming the Gospel of Peace;
That sinful desires,
Like false Baal fires,
Must die ere our troubles can cease.

IV
Ye sons of the soil,
In hardship and toil,
That plough both the land and the sea,
Take heart while you can,
And think of the Man
Who toiled by the Lake Galilee.

V
When fierce tempests smote
That frail little boat,
They ceased at His gentle command;
Despite all our fear,
The Saviour is near
To safeguard our dear Fatherland.

VI
Let storm-winds rejoice,
And lift up their voice,
No danger our homes can befall;
Our green hills and rocks
Encircle our flocks,
And keep out the sea like a wall.

VII
Our Island, thus blest,
No foe can molest;
Our grain and our fish shall increase;
From battle and sword
Protecteth the Lord,
And crowneth our nation with peace.

VIII
Then let us rejoice
With heart, soul and voice,
And in The Lord's promise confide;
That each single hour
We trust in His power,
No evil our souls can betide.

Manx lyrics

I
O Halloo nyn ghooie,
O Chliegeen ny s'bwaaie
Ry gheddyn er ooir aalin Yee,
Ta dt' Ardstoyl Reill Thie
Myr Barrool er ny hoie
Dy reayl shin ayns seyrsnys as shee.

II
Tra Gorree yn Dane
Haink er traie ec y Lhane
Son Ree Mannin v'eh er ny reih
'S va creenaght veih Heose
Er ny chur huggey neose
Dy reill harrin lesh cairys as graih

III
Ren nyn ayryn g'imraa
Va Nooghyn shenn traa
Yn Sushtal dy Hee fockley magh
Shegin yeearree peccoil
Myr far aileyn Vaal,
Ve er ny chur mow son dy bragh.

IV
Vec ooasle yn Theihll
Ayns creoighys tooilleil
Ta traaue ooir as faarkey, Gow cree
Ny jarrood yn fer mie
Ta coadey 'n lught-thie
Ren tooilleil liorish Logh Galilee.

V
D'eiyr yn sterrym noon as noal
Yn baatey beg moal
Fo-harey hug Eh geay as keayn
Trooid ooilley nyn ghaue
Ta'n Saualtagh ec laue
Dy choadey nyn Vannin veg veen.

VI
Lhig dorrinyn bra
Troggal seose nyn goraa
As brishey magh ayns ard arrane
Ta nyn groink aalin glass
Yn vooir cummal ass
As coadey lught-thie as shioltane.

VII
Nyn Ellan fo-hee
Cha boir noidyn ee
Dy bishee nyn eeastyn as grine
Nee'n Chiarn shin y reayll
Voish strieughyn yn theihll
As crooinnagh lesh shee 'n ashoon ain.

VIII
Lhig dooin boggoil bee,
Lesh annym as cree,
As croghey er gialdyn yn Chiarn;
Dy vodmayd dagh oor,
Treishteil er e phooar,
Dagh olk ass nyn anmeenyn (Note: Sometimes written h'anmeenyn.) 'hayrn.

IPA transcription (Note: See Help:IPA/Manx, Manx language § Orthography and Manx language § Phonology.)

1
[oː ha.luː nən ɣu̯iː]
[oː xlʲɛ.ɡʲiːn nə‿s.bwɛi̯]
[rə ɣɛ.ðən ɛɹ̝ ur ɛː.lən jiː]
[t̪aː d̪ə əɹ̝d̪.st̪ɔl reːl.t̪aɪ̯]
[məɹ̝ bə.ruːl ɛɹ̝ nə haɪ̯]
[d̪ə reːl ʃiᵈn uns seːrs.nəs as ʃiː]

8
[lig d̪un bɔː.ɣoːl biː]
[lɛʃ aː.nəm as kriː]
[as krɔː.ɣə ɛɹ̝ ɡʲaːl.d̪ən ən t͡ʃaːrn]
[d̪ə vɔːd̪.mədʲ d̪ax uːɹ̝]
[t̪reːʃ.t̪eːl ɛr ə fuːɹ̝]
[d̪ax ɔlk as nən haːn.miː.nən haːrn]

== See also ==
- List of British anthems
