= William Cubbon =

Manx nationalist, antiquarian, author, businessman and librarian

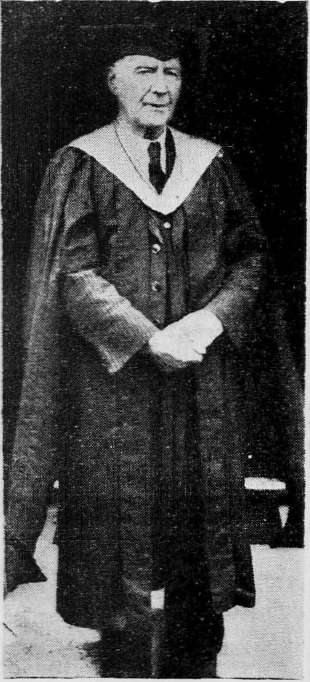
- William Cubbon, M.A.
- Born: 28 May 1865; Croit-e-Caley, Isle of Man
- Died: 1 January 1955 (aged 89); Brentwood, Essex, United Kingdom
- Known for: The promotion of Manx Culture. Manx Nationalism.
- Children: Harry Cubbon; Nelson Cubbon

William Cubbon M.A. (28 May 1865 – 1 January 1955) was a Manx nationalist, antiquarian, author, businessman and librarian who was the first secretary of the Manx Museum, later becoming Director of the Museum.

== Biography ==
=== Early life ===
Cubbon was born in the small hamlet of Croit-e-Caley in the parish of Rushen, Isle of Man, on 28 May 1865. His father, James Cubbon, was a Master Mariner who hailed from Port St Mary.

=== Business ===
After leaving school, Cubbon took employment with the Isle of Man Examiner as a compositor and in 1900, together with Horace Lightfoot, Cubbon acquired the Manx Sun newspaper. Under the ownership of Cubbon and Lightfoot, the editorial standpoint of the Manx Sun became nationalist in orientation, and in addition to his newspaper proprietorship Cubbon also became heavily involved in the promotion of Manx history and culture.

The Manx Sun and its business were taken over by the Isle of Man Examiner in 1906, with Cubbon rejoining the title in the capacity of manager of the stationery business.

Leaving the Examiner in 1912, Cubbon became Borough Librarian of Douglas; in this period he published A Manx Book of Poetry (1913), which was particularly aimed at young people with a view to getting them involved in the culture of the Isle of Man. He also published a set of maps illustrating the ancient treens (divisions of parishes) and land divisions in the island's six sheadings, along with the names of the principal early land owners. During the First World War Cubbon became manager of the Labour Exchange.

=== Manx Museum ===
In 1922 the Manx Museum was established on the former site of Noble's Hospital in Douglas. Philip Kermode was appointed the museum's director, with Cubbon appointed as secretary. Following Kermode's death in 1932 Cubbon succeeded him as director, a post he held until his retirement in 1940, when he was replaced by Basil Megaw FRSE. One of the first undertakings by Cubbon in his role as secretary was the compilation of the indexes and several other appendixes to the Rev. Theophilus Talbot's English translation of the Manorial Roll, referred to as the Manx Doomsday Book, which was published in 1924.

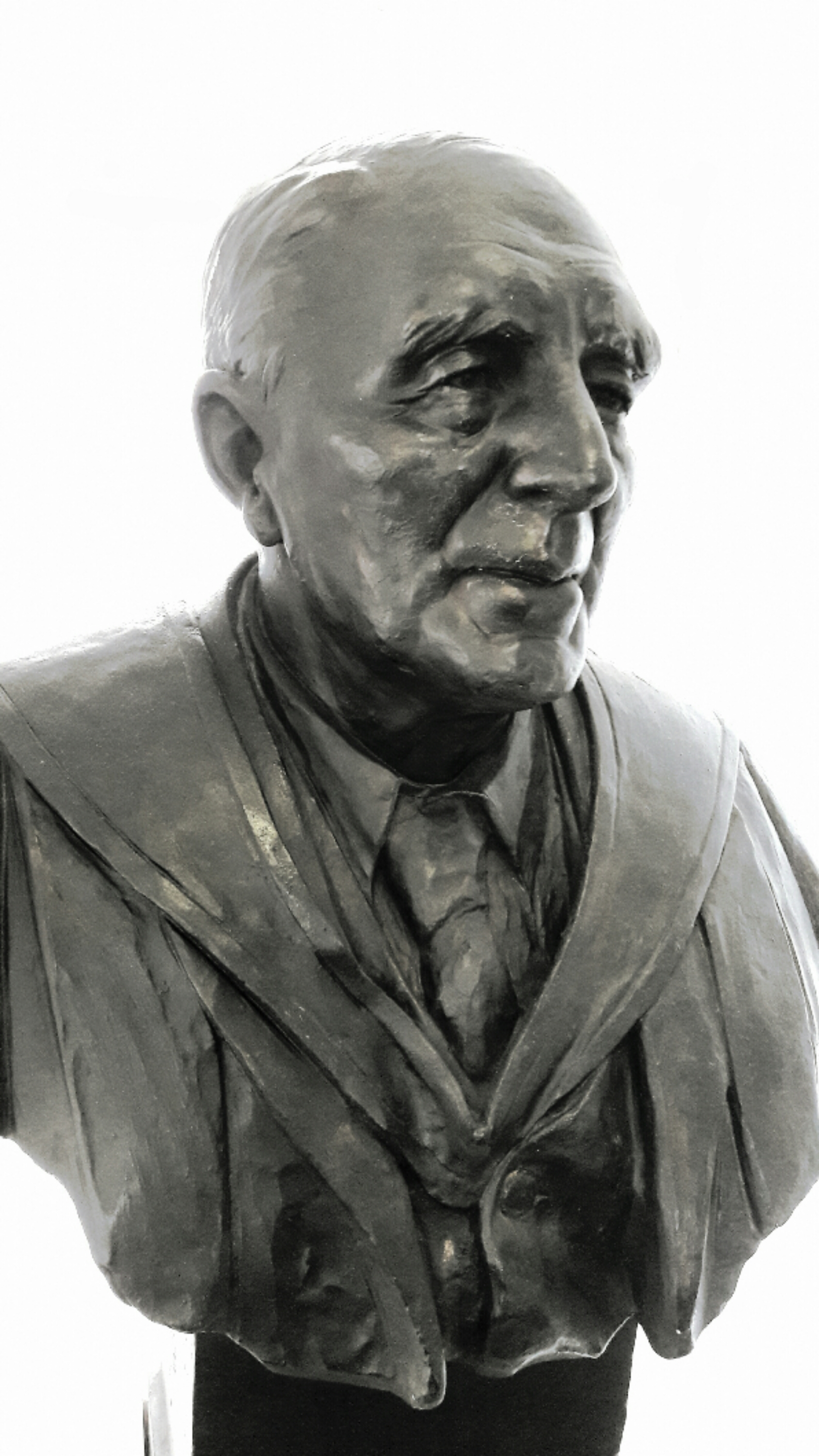
A bust of William Cubbon

Said to have been passionately patriotic with regard to the Isle of Man, his appointment as Director of the Manx Museum was said to have been Cubbon's great ambition. In 1899 he had helped in the formation of the Manx Language Society (Yn Çheshaght Ghailckagh), and served the society as secretary and president. This in turn led to him becoming an energetic figure in the Natural History and Antiquarian Society, again serving in the role of president.

During his time at the Manx Museum, Cubbon compiled the Bibliography of the Literature of the Isle of Man, published in two editions in 1933 and 1939; he also conducted numerous explorations for the Antiquarian Society and gave lecture on various subjects.

Cubbon celebrated the centenary of the publication of Archibald Cregeen's dictionary in Peel in 1938 stating that "we students would be poor without his precious book".

At the age of 85 Cubbon began work on his Island Heritage, which was published in 1952.

=== Honours and awards ===
In recognition of his achievements William Cubbon received the degree of Master of Arts from Liverpool University. The Government of Norway conferred on him the Knighthood of the Order of St Olav.

=== Death ===
William Cubbon died at the home of his son, at Brentwood, Essex on New Year's Day, 1955.

== See also ==
- P. M. C. Kermode
- Josephine Kermode
- Thomas Allen (Manx author)
- John Kneen
- W. Clucas Kinley
- Manx Museum
