= Thomas Allen (Manx author) =

Vicar of Maughold and an author of Manx carols

Thomas Allen (1710–1754) was Vicar of Maughold and an author of Manx carvals.

== Life ==
Thomas Allen was born in 1710, the son of Henry Allen and Jane Allen (née Stevenson). He was curate of Andreas from 1739 to 1746, during which time he married Mary Lace, of Ballavarry, Andreas.

After his father's death, Allen moved to take up the vicarage at Maughold on 2 June 1746. Thomas was the last in the line of five successive sons to hold the position of Vicar of Maughold Parish: Thomas (1625 to 1660), Robert (1660 to 1666), Thomas (1666 to 1727), Henry (1727 to 1748).

Allen served at Maughold until his death in 1754 at the age of 44. Like his ancestors before him, he was buried in the Maughold churchyard, on 6 August 1754. He left behind him a large personal estate worth £270. To his 11-year-old son, also named Thomas, he left his silver buckles, his gun, his mare and follower, and £5 upon reaching the age of 21 (in addition to property). He also had one daughter, Alice, who would live until the age of 72, dying in 1811.

== Carvals ==
Allen is best remembered today for writing some of the earliest remaining examples of Manx carvals. Carvals (a corruption of the English “carol”) are long rhyming poems to be sung, originally confined to the theme of the nativity, but subsequently developing into other Christian themes. They were sung at the popular "Oiel Verrey" service, a description of which is given in The Folklore of the Isle of Man by A.W. Moore:

After the prayers were read, and a hymn was sung, the parson usually went home, leaving the Clerk in charge. Then each one who had a carol to sing would do so in turn, so that the proceedings were continued till a very late hour, and sometimes, also, unfortunately became of a rather riotous character, as it was a custom for the female part of the congregation to provide themselves with peas, which they flung at their bachelor friends. On the way home, a considerable proportion of the congregation would probably visit the nearest inn, where they would partake of the traditional drink on such occasions, viz., Hot ale, flavoured with spice, ginger, and pepper.

Lacking any other substantial body of writing in Manx, carvals have been identified as the sole source of original Manx literature prior to the late 19th Century. Allen is therefore considered an important Manx writer, having had his two extant pieces published in the first publication of Manx carvals, Carvalyn Gailckagh (or 'Manx Carols'), in 1891. Allen's carvals were entitled 'Tra Ta Mish Jeaghyn Er Yn Yrid Heose' ('A Hymn on Man's Shameful Fall'), written in 1728 and comprising 47 verses; and 'Trog Seose, My Chree' ('Rise Up, My Heart'), written in 1739 and consisting of 31 verses. Extracts of them are as follows:

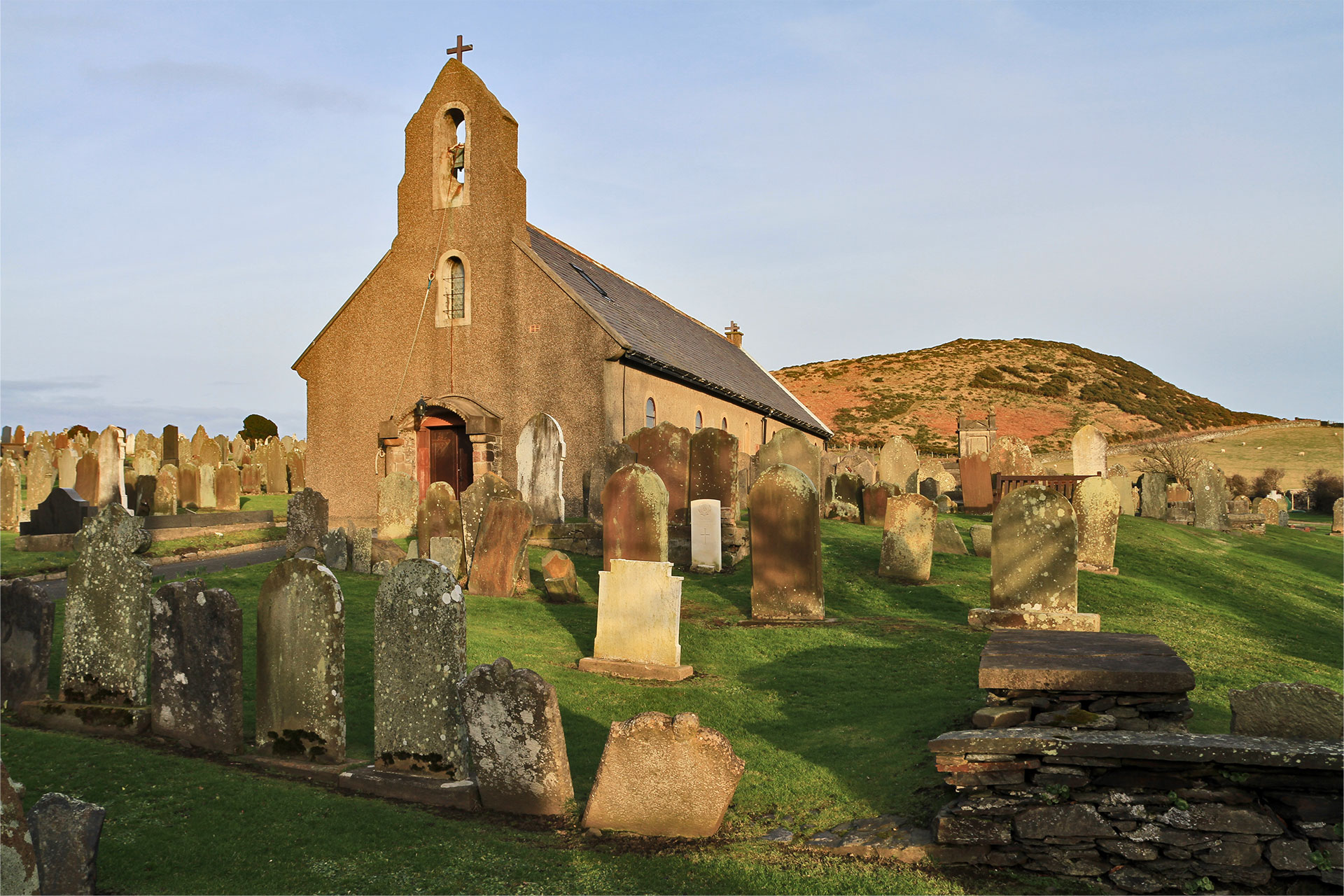
Kirk Maughold

Tra Ta Mish Jeaghyn Er Yn Yrid Heose / A Hymn on Man's Shameful Fall
O, ghooinney aalin, maynryy v'ou sy traa, Cha row oyr olkys syd noi oie as laa, Son Jee va lhiatt's as oeilley fo dty reill, Cha row ort laccal nhee erbee sy theihll, Stiagh Paradise hie oo er choyrt boayl veen, Ayns shen va gaase dy-chooilley vass jeh hene.	O beautiful man, happy you were in the time You had no reason for wickedness night and day For God was with you and all were beneath your rule You lacked for nothing at all in the world Into Paradise you were given a dear place In there every fruit was growing of its own accord

Trog Seose, My Chree / Rise Up, My Heart
Trog seose, my chree, nagh mie dhyts nish, Dty aigney slane hyndaa, Voish shelg lurg nhee aghyn faase y theihll Nagh vel agh myr veeagh kay. Ayns geiyrtys er tou goll rishyn, Ta oaggey nei yn gheay, Ny marrinee gleck noi geay as muir, Ta ooilley slane ny oie. Te myr veagh tonn jeh'n faarkey quaagh, Lesh sterrym goll heose as sheese, Shen myr ta mish fud boirey'n theihll Cha vel aym laa dy aash.	Rise up, my heart! 'tis well for thee To turn thyself wholly From following weak worldly things, Which as a vapour pass. In following these thou'rt like to him Who fights against the winds, Or sailors wrestling all the night Against the stormy sea. Just like a wave in a rough sea, With storms heaves up and down, So I, midst troubles of this world, Have not a day of rest.
