= William Henry Gill (composer) =

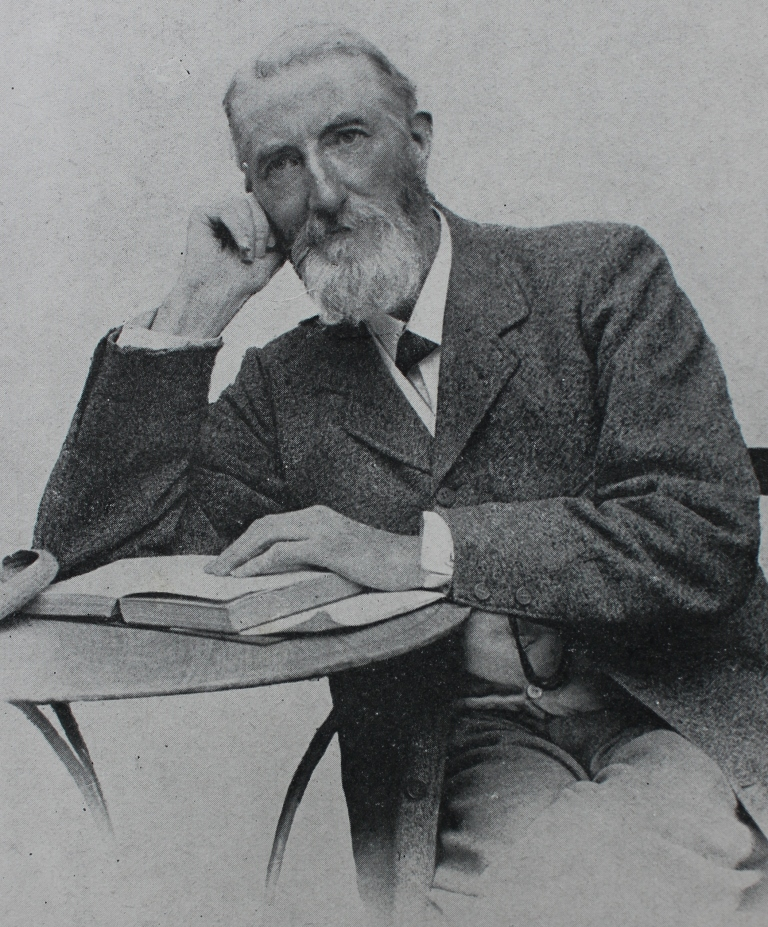
- Born: 24 October 1839; Marsala, Sicily
- Died: 27 June 1923 (aged 83); Angmering, Sussex, England

William Henry Gill (24 October 1839 – 27 June 1923) was a Manx musical scholar who wrote and composed the anthem of Isle of Man, "Arrane Ashoonagh Dy Vannin".

== Life and career ==
Gill was born at Marsala, Sicily to Manx parents, and he was educated at King William's College. He lived in London, England most of his life but remained interested in his roots. The anthem is a traditional Manx ballad. Gill's words were published as "Eaisht oo as Clash-tyn" ("Listen and Hear") in Manx National Songs in 1896. "The Manx Fisherman's Evening Hymn" and "Peel Castle." Gill also collected and arranged material in England, particularly that associated with Sussex.

Gill also published A Manx Wedding and Other Songs.
