= Colin Jerry =

Manx cultural activist

- Colin Jerry, 1970s
- Born: Colin Jerry; 15 June 1936; Petworth, Sussex
- Died: 19 December 2008 (aged 72); Nobles Hospital, Isle of Man
- Occupation: Teacher
- Writing career
- Genres: Poetry, song, music, stories

Colin Jerry RBV (Manx: Colin y Jerree; 15 June 1936 – 19 December 2008) was a Manx cultural activist best known for his contributions to Manx music through his books, Kiaull yn Theay ('Music of the folk'), published in two volumes. He was awarded the Reih Bleeaney Vanannan in 1991 for his contributions to Manx culture which were 'extensive and staggering.'

== Life ==
Colin Jerry was born in Petworth, Sussex, on 15 June 1936. During World War II his father was in the RAF and was stationed at Jurby on the Isle of Man, where Jerry and his mother visited during their holidays. Jerry grew attached to the island and returned to it often, including for his honeymoon following his marriage to Cristl in 1963. He moved to the Isle of Man permanently in 1968 when he took up a job as a teacher at Demesne Road and then Peel Clothworkers' School where he spent the rest of his career.

== Manx music and dance ==
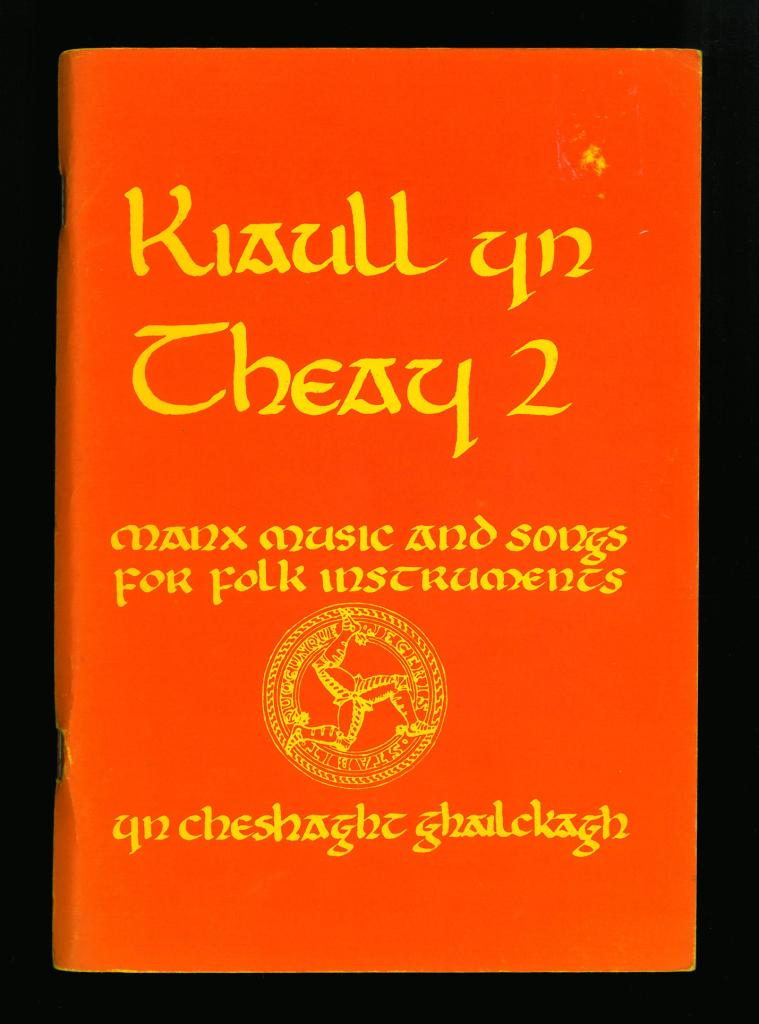
The second volume of Kiaull yn Theay ('Music of the folk'), commonly known as the Red Book

Colin Jerry's main musical interests when he moved to the island was New Orleans Jazz, and he came to play trumpet for the Garff City Stompers, and also occasionally for the Tholtan Builders. However, once living on the island he immersed himself in traditional Manx music, joining Celtic music sessions in Peel, from which emerged the band, Celtic Tradition. As was common for folk groups at that time, Celtic Tradition focused on an Irish/Scottish folk music repertoire, as there was no easy access to Manx music. Jerry looked into correcting this lack of a Manx repertoire by learning Manx and carrying out his own research.

Jerry pulled together Manx music collected in the twentieth Century by Mona Douglas and at the end of the nineteenth Century in A. W. Moore's Manx Ballads and Music (1896) and W. H. Gill's Manx National Music (1898). Jerry also went to the important manuscript collections of Dr John Clague, W.H. Gill and J. F. Gill in the Manx Museum for music that had never previously been in print.

Because of the difficulty that Jerry had encountered in unearthing these pieces of music, he decided to publish them to make them more easily accessible for others. By hand Jerry wrote out the staves, lyrics and a few illustrations for an Isle of Man Board of Education Local Studies Project, photocopied and made up into a booklet entitled Kiaull ny Manninee in 1977, which, in an expanded form, came to form Kiaull yn Theay ('Music of the Folk'), which was published by Yn Çheshaght Ghailckagh ('Manx Language Society') in 1978. The following year this was joined by a second volume, Kiaull yn Theay 2, published in 1979 in the same hand-written style as the first volume.

The two Kiaull yn Theay books, affectionately known as the red and yellow books due to their distinctive covers, are widely used on the Isle of Man today, particularly in all of the island's schools. It has been reckoned that these books "have, without a doubt, formed the single most significant contribution to the promotion of Manx Music since its revival."

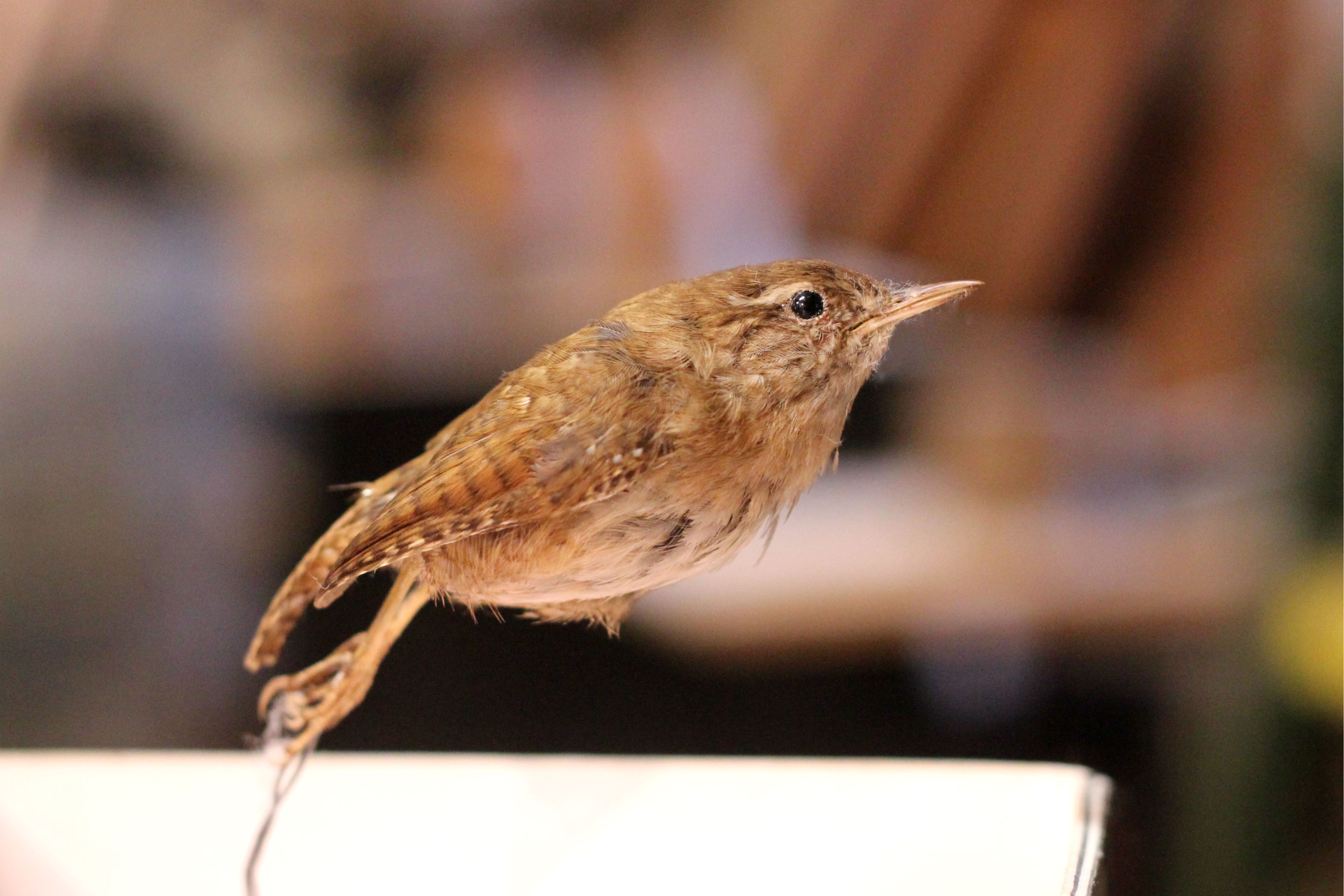
The taxidermied wren used for Hunt the Wren by Bock Yuan Fannee

Jerry went on to write and edit other books on Manx music, including some of his own original lyrics and translations into Manx. Notable amongst his other books is Slongan son Juan y Clague / A Garland for John Clague: A New Book of Old Songs, which he co-edited with John Kaneen in 1988. Jerry also led the evolution of the band Celtic Tradition, with its basis in Irish and Scottish music, into Bwoaie Doal ('Blind Boy') which played only music with a Manx provenance. This band is today recognised as one of the most influential groups in the early days of the Manx Music revival during the 1970s.

Jerry was also central to the continued revival of Manx dancing. Following a discussion with Mona Douglas in 1975 Jerry created an all-male six-person group to perform 'Mylecharaine's March', a dance which Douglas had collected. Jerry named the group 'Bock Yuan Fannee' (literally 'the buck of John the Flayer', an expression referring to walking or a walking stick) and their early practices took place in the kipper yards of Peel. As well as 'Mylecharaine's March', they also performed 'The White Boys' play at Christmas, including a six hand longsword dance. The group is still in existence today and it is now mixed.

Jerry was also highly involved in the reorganisation of Yn Chruinnaght in 1977 and also in Manx participation in Inter-Celtic Festivals off the island. This included co-ordinating the Manx contribution to the Lorient Festival for many years, and also the Lowender Peran Festival. He also took part in the Gaelic Forums that the Celtic League Manx Branch organised in the early 1980s and he contributed articles in Manx (and English), mainly commenting on the cultural scene, for Carn (the Celtic League quarterly journal).

Jerry also made his instruments, including the harp, which was the instrument that his wife played. He was also responsible for introducing the uilleann pipes to Manx traditional music.

== Manx language and literature ==
As a part of immersing himself in all aspects of the preservation and revitalisation of Manx culture, Colin Jerry picked up and became fluent in Manx shortly after arriving on the Isle of Man. Through his subsequent involvement in Yn Cheshaght Ghailckagh during the 1970s, Jerry became involved in the earliest Manx language broadcasts on Manx Radio. He worked with Robert Corteen Carswell, David Fisher and Cristl Jerry to create programmes that included short plays, comic sketches and documentaries.

In 1976 Jerry contributed short stories to Skeealaght, subtitled Shiartanse dy skeealyn ass beeal-arrish ny shenn Vanninee as jeh deiney elley ('Some stories from the oral tradition of the old Manx people and from other people'), published by Yn Cheshaght Ghailckagh. As well as Colin Jerry, the collection included original pieces of fiction and essays by Lewis Crellin, John Crellin and George Broderick.

From 1976 Jerry began working on a series of short stories in Manx which satirised the political events of the Isle of Man at the time. These used well-known children's stories as the basis and they were eventually released in a hand-written and illustrated form in 1989 under the title of one of its stories, Ny Tree Muckeyn Beggey ('The Three Little Pigs'). Jerry donated the profits of the sale of this book to help the families of the imprisoned F.S.F.O. campaigners who were protesting against immigration from England to the island. The title story of this book was collected in Robert Corteen Carswell's 2010 book, Manannan's Cloak: An Anthology of Manx Literature. The beginning paragraph gives an indication of his style:

Ny Tree Muckyn Beggey / The Three Little Pigs [extract]
| Feer foddey er dy henney, roish my screeu ad skeeal erbee, as tra va deiney as beiyn loayrt rish nyn geilley as baghey cooidjagh ayns shee, va ellan beg ayn. Va'n sleih va cummal er'n ellan beg shoh feer ghennal, ga dy row ad g'obbragh bunnys feiyn'n laa, as ga nagh row monney argid oc. Va nyn baitchyn slayntoil, va ny magheryn oc messoil, as va'n keayn lome lane dy eeastyn mooarey. Myr shen cha row monney oc agh cha row ad g'eearree monney as cha lhiass daue g'obbragh ro hrong. | A very long time ago, before they wrote down any story, and when men and animals spoke to each other and lived together in peace, there was a little island. The people who were living in this little island were very happy, though they were working almost right through the day, and though they didn't have much money. Their children were healthy, their fields were fruitful, and the sea was chock full of big fish. So they didn't have much but they didn't want much and they didn't have to work too hard. |

== Death ==
On the evening of 19 December 2008 Colin Jerry was performing Manx music on the uilleann pipes at the Tynwald Hill Inn pub in St John's. Having just played his favourite carol he collapsed. Friends summoned an ambulance and he was taken to Noble's Hospital, Braddan, where he died that evening. He left his wife, Cristl, and three children – Bridget, Patrick and Kate – and grandchildren.

== Publications ==
- Kiaull ny Manninee. Douglas: Manx Language and Folklore Group, Local Studies Project, Isle of Man Board of Education. 1977.
- Kiaull yn Theay: Manx Music and Songs for Folk Instruments (No 1). Douglas: Yn Cheshaght Ghailckagh. 1978.
- Kiaull yn Theay: Manx Music and Songs for Folk Instruments (No 2). Douglas: Yn Cheshaght Ghailckagh. 1979.
- Cur Cheb (Have a Try): A Beginners Book of Manx Tunes for Whistle or Recorder. (Privately published). 1982.
- Kiaull Vannin. (privately published). 1987.
- Slongan son Juan y Clague / A Garland for John Clague: A New Book of Old Songs. (privately published). 1988. (ed. with John Kaneen).
- Ny Tree Muckeyn Beggey. (privately published). 1989.
- Angels, Soldiers, Lovers and Other Folks. (privately published). 1993.
- Shey Skeealyn Jeig. (privately published). 1996.
