= Leslie Quirk =

Manx language speaker and teacher

- Born: 30 September 1914; Peel, Isle of Man
- Died: 20 October 2004 (aged 90); Peel, Isle of Man
- Other name: Y Kione Jiarg
- Organization: Yn Çheshaght Ghailckagh
- Known for: Promotion of the Manx language
- Awards: Reih Bleeaney Vanannan

Leslie Quirk RBV (30 September 1914 – 20 October 2004), also known as Y Kione Jiarg (Manx pronunciation: [ən kʲaun ˈdʒɑːɾɡ, kʲoːn]; lit. 'the red head'), was a Manx language activist and teacher who was involved with the language's revival on the Isle of Man in the 20th century. His work recording the last native speakers of the language with the Irish Folklore Commission and the Manx Museum helped to ensure that a spoken record of the Manx language survived.

== Early life ==
Quirk was born in Peel but raised by his grandparents due to his mother's infirmity after a bout of double pneumonia. He learned his first words of Manx from his step-grandmother, a native speaker, who taught him to recite the Lord's Prayer as a young boy at bedtime. She also instilled in him a pride in Manx, which historically was a low-prestige language on the island:

"Don't let anyone tell you it's a rubbishy language," she said, "because it isn't. I know it's a good language". And technically, linguistically, she was right.

As a young adult, Quirk took lessons in the Harbour Master's Office in Peel with Caesar Cashin, a native speaker and fisherman, and president of Yn Çheshaght Ghailckagh. Several other high-level Manx speakers such as Charles Craine and John Gell also learned there.

== Manx language ==
Quirk was one of the several active Manx speakers who learned the language from the diminishing number of elderly native speakers in the first half of the 20th century. Travelling around the Manx countryside with other enthusiasts such as Bill Radcliffe and Walter Clarke, Quirk improved on the Manx he learned from Caesar Cashen by visiting the elderly Manx speakers and learning directly from them. These learners were part of a small tight-knit group of high level speakers who would go on to be vital members of Yn Çheshaght Ghailckagh, and also of the language revival movement. The group would be a crucial link between the last generation of native speakers, and those who learned Manx after the death of Ned Maddrell in 1974.

Quirk was involved with the recordings of the last native speakers under Kevin Danaher of the Irish Folklore Commission in 1948. As Quirk was familiar with the elderly native speakers and met them many times, he can be heard on several of the recordings speaking to them.

The members of Yn Çheshaght Ghailckagh later began making their own recordings in the early 1950s, despite financial and technical constraints.

== Folk-Life Survey ==
The work of the Irish Folklore Commission in the summer of 1948 spurred on the Manx Museum to establish something similar on the Isle of Man. This eventually coalesced into the Manx Folk-Life Survey, a large scale ethnographic record that aimed to document all aspects of Manx life from the previous century. It contained a range of media including hundreds of interviews, photographs, questionnaires, publicity campaigns, an extensive store of material objects, and over 30 hours of audio recordings.

After training in Ireland, Quirk was employed by the Manx Museum as the Survey's first full-time collector and headed up a team of over 30 volunteer field-workers collecting information and materials from informants. The audio recordings were of particular use for the Manx language community, as they built on the work of the Irish Folklore Commission.

== Legacy ==
Quirk's tireless work teaching Manx inspired a new generation of younger Manx speakers, particularly after the death of the last native speaker Ned Maddrell; "he was the nearest we had to an old native speaker of Manx." While still at school, Brian Stowell started attending lessons taught by Quirk, who then introduced him to the other members of Yn Çheshaght Ghailckagh such as Doug Fargher. Brian Stowell would go on to be one of the most important figures in the modern Manx revival movement.

But meeting Leslie Quirk was crucial for me – he was a fluent speaker of Manx who'd learned his Manx from native speakers. In fact, he was very nearly a native speaker as well as being a kindly, saintly man.

In recognition of his lifetime of work in preserving the culture and language of the Isle of Man, Quirk received the Reih Bleeaney Vanannan award in 1997.
