= John Clague (physician) =

Manx physician and collector of traditional music

- Born: 10 October 1842; Ballanorris, Isle of Man
- Died: 23 August 1908 (aged 65); Castletown, Isle of Man
- Education: King William's College, Guy's Hospital
- Occupation: Physician
- Notable work: Manx National Songs, Manx National Music, Cooinaghtyn Manninagh: Manx Reminiscences

John Clague (10 October 1842 – 23 August 1908) was a Manx physician and a collector of Manx music, songs, dances, and customs.

== Early life and education ==
Clague was born in Ballanorris, Arbory on the Isle of Man in 1842 to tenant farmer Henry Clague and his wife Elizabeth. He was educated in the local school in Ballabeg before attending the Old Grammar School in Castletown and later King William's College. Clague received his medical training in Guy's Hospital in London and returned to the Isle of Man in 1873 to practise medicine. He married Margaret Eliza Watterson in the same year.

== Work as a physician ==
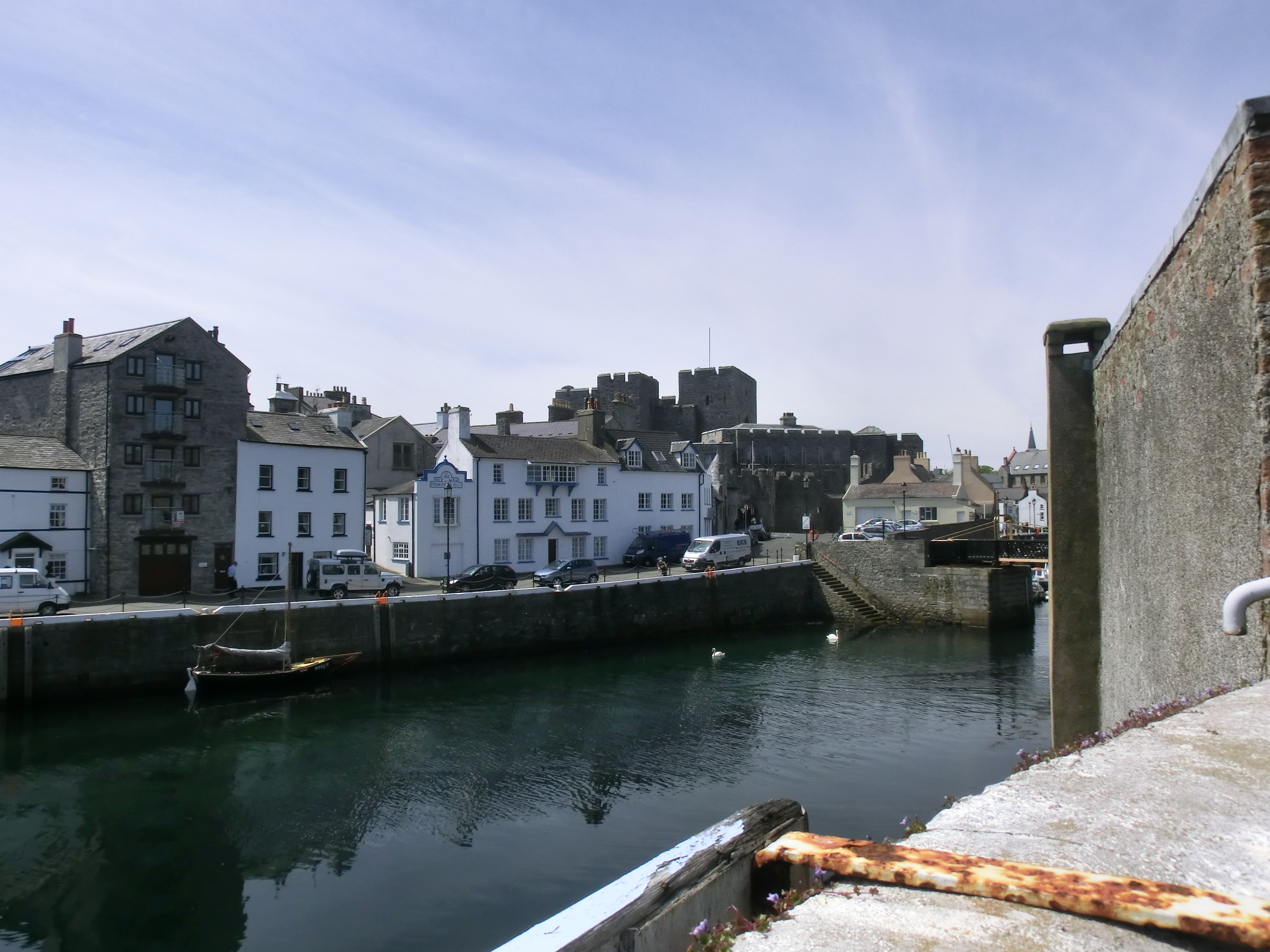
The town of Castletown where Clague worked for most of his life.

Despite coming from a relatively humble farming background, Clague excelled while studying for his medical degree, winning several awards and rising to become the "foremost medical practitioner on the Isle of Man". Based in Castletown, he was surgeon to Castle Rushen jail, to the household of the lieutenant governor, and also to the troops garrisoned in the barracks there. Clague worked in the south of the Isle of Man for decades and was a prominent figure on the island in his own right. Manx language teacher and author John Gell remembered Clague coming to treat his father after he fell sick and that he was well known for refusing to take payment from patients.

== Music collector ==
Clague was aware that traditional Manx music and culture was rapidly declining. As a doctor, he was an influential and respected figure in the community and he used this position to collect songs, dances, and melodies as he travelled in the south of the island. Clague's informants were generally men from working backgrounds such as fishermen. His favourite informant was the blind fisherman Thomas Kermode:

He lost the sight of his eyes after small-pox when he was very little, and was obliged to use his ears in place of his eyes. He had a wonderfully good memory, and he was good to sing, and he knew the Manx language very well. The greater part of the words and songs that I have taken down from his singing, and I spent many happy hours in writing them down. Although he was blind, he continued at his work as a fisherman for many years. He had great intelligence, and I owe him a great deal for the knowledge he has given me of the life of the Manx at the beginning of the nineteenth century.

Clague collected these works and arranged them in Manx National Songs which was published in 1896 and Manx National Music in 1898.

== Yn Çheshaght Ghailckagh ==
Following the decline of Manx as a community language on the Isle of Man during much of the 19th century, interest in the language was renewed, most notably among educated men in the town of Peel where it was still common to hear Manx spoken by the fishermen. Although Clague was in the south of the island, there were still many native speakers; and by talking to them, he taught himself the Manx language as part of his effort to preserve traditional Manx culture. During his work he spoke to people who could speak Manx or could remember the traditional Manx songs.

Along with several other prominent members of the Manx language revival such as J. J. Kneen and Edmund Goodwin, Clague was a founding member of Yn Çheshaght Ghailckagh in 1899 in Peel. A. W. Moore, the director of the Manx Museum and the organisation's first president, explained that Yn Çheshaght Ghailckagh was concerned not only with the preservation and promotion of the Manx language, but rather with all things related to Manx culture:

Though called the Manx Language Society, it should, I think, by no means confine its energies to the promotion of an interest in the language, but extend them to the study of Manx history, the collection of Manx music, ballads, carols, folklore, proverbs, place-names, including the old field names which are rapidly dying out in a word, to the preservation of everything that IS distinctively Manx, and, above all, to the cultivation of a national spirit.

== Later years ==
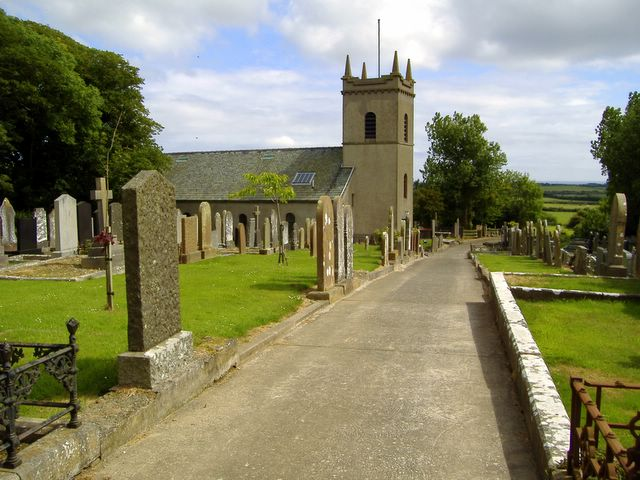
St Columba, Arbory Parish Church where Clague is buried.

Clague retired in the early 20th century, but continued to see some of his long-term patients until shortly before his death on 23 August 1908. The funeral took place at St. Columba, Arbory Parish church in Ballabeg. Many of the shops and businesses in Castletown closed for the day in respect. The bell tower was added in 1915 in memory of Clague.

His bilingual book Cooinaghtyn Manninagh: Manx Reminiscences was published posthumously in 1911.
