= Charles Craine =

Manx language speaker and activist

- Chalse y Craayne
- Born: 1911
- Died: 1979 (aged 67–68); Ballaugh, Isle of Man
- Occupations: Bank manager and Manx language teacher
- Organization: Yn Çheshaght Ghailckagh

Charles Craine (1911–1979) also known as Chalse y Craayne, was a Manx language activist and teacher who was involved with the revival of the Manx language on the Isle of Man in the 20th century.

== Manx language ==
Charles Craine was one of the several active Manx speakers who learned the language from the diminishing number of elderly native speakers on the Isle of Man in the first half of the 20th century. Along with Manx speakers Bill Radcliffe, John Gell, and Leslie Quirk, Craine learned Manx by travelling around the Manx countryside, visiting the elderly native Manx speakers and learning directly from them.

These learners were part of a small tight-knit group of high level speakers who would go on to be vital members of Yn Çheshaght Ghailckagh, but also the language revival movement. The group would be a crucial link between the last generation of native speakers, and those who learned Manx after the death of Ned Maddrell in 1974. Like many learners of this group, Craine also learned Manx by attending lessons at the Harbour Master's Office in Peel.

For much of his life, Craine was employed in the Isle of Man Bank and held positions in Douglas and Laxey before being appointed manager of the bank in Ramsey. Craine's position in the bank in Ramsey meant that he came into contact with several of the remaining speakers in the north of the Island:

one Saturday, he said, he bucked up enough courage to speak to them in Manx when they came to his counter. They each replied in Manx, Craine said, and he then introduced himself to them, and thereafter spoke to them in Manx whenever they would come to his counter.

He discovered several of the last native speakers himself in the 1930s that would later go on to be some of the informants in the Irish Folklore Commission's recordings in 1948. Craine worked for much of his life to promote the use of Manx and was noted for his enthusiasm in encouraging other learners.

== Later years ==
For much of the 1960s and 1970s Craine was Yn Lhaihder for Tynwald. This is a centuries-old tradition that required Craine to read out new laws that were to be enacted in the Manx language on Tynwald Hill. In 1978 Craine was appointed as Captain of the Parish of Ballaugh. This is mostly a ceremonial role that required attendance at Tynwald. After Craine's death in 1979, his contribution to his native area and the language of the Isle of Man was celebrated with a Manx language plaque on Ballaugh bridge.
