= Brian Stowell =

Manx writer

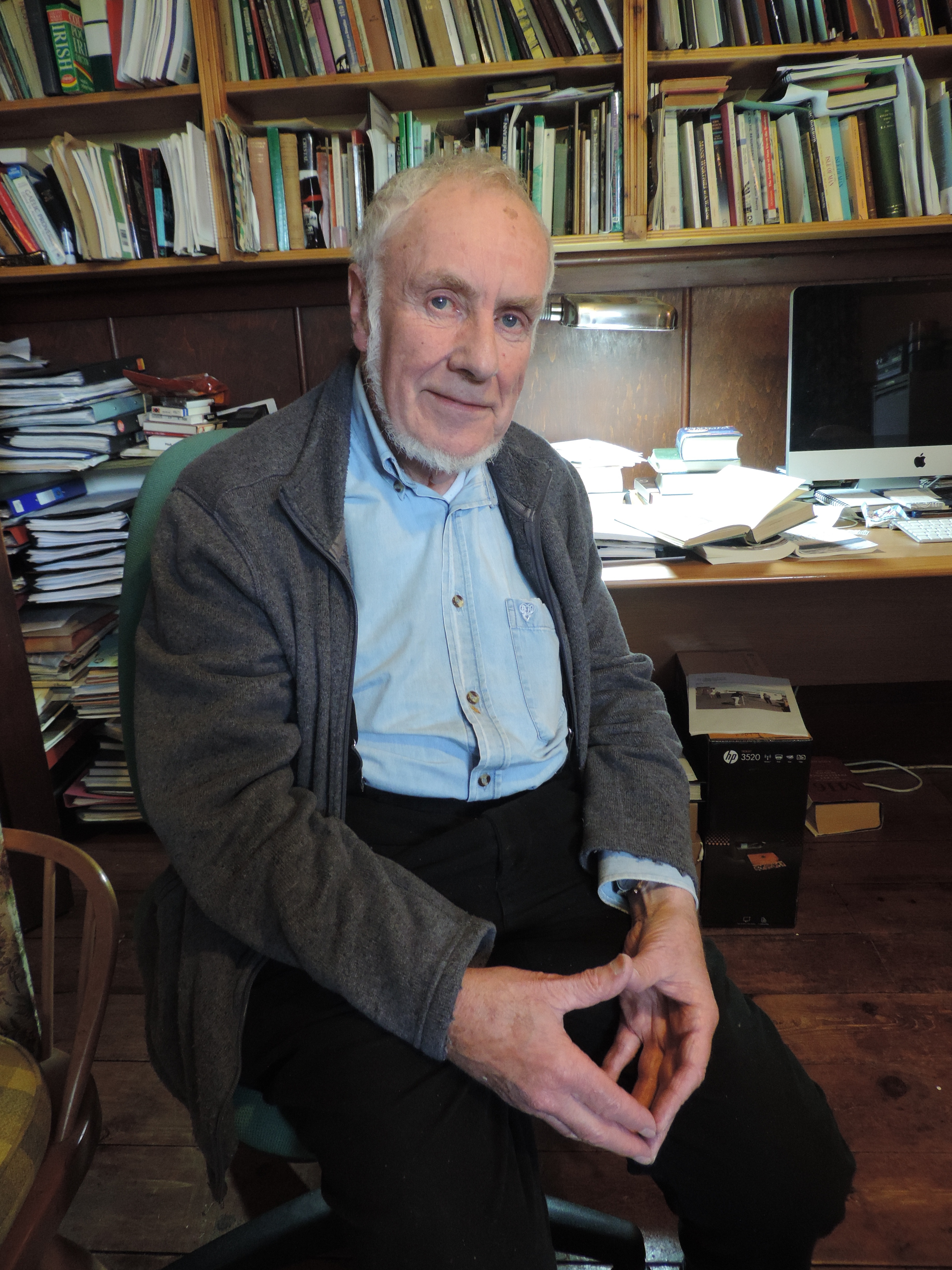
- Stowell in 2015
- Born: Thomas Brian Stowell; 6 September 1936; Douglas, Isle of Man
- Died: 18 January 2019 (aged 82)
- Other names: Brian Mac Stoyll
- Education: Liverpool University; Liverpool John Moores University
- Occupations: Radio personality; linguist; physicist; author
- Notable work: Dunveryssyn yn Tooder-Folley ("The Vampire Murders")
- Spouses: Pat Price (m. 1958, divorced); Julia Berney (m. 1982; died 2018)
- Children: 4
- Awards: Reih Bleeaney Vanannan (2008); Tynwald Honour (2010)

Thomas Brian Stowell RBV TH (6 September 1936 – 18 January 2019), also known as Brian Mac Stoyll, was a Manx radio personality, Celticist, physicist, and author. He was formerly Yn Lhaihder ("The Reader") to the Parliament of the Isle of Man, Tynwald. He is considered one of the primary people behind the revival of the Manx language.

== Early years and the Manx language ==
Stowell was born in Douglas, Isle of Man on 6 September 1936 to Caroline (née Stothard) and Tommy Stowell. His mother's maternal grandparents were native Manx speakers, although they did not pass the language on to their children. He attended Murray's Road Junior School before attending Douglas High School for Boys, where he excelled academically.

Stowell was inspired to start learning Manx after he read an article written by Doug Fargher passionately defending the Manx language in 1953. Stowell described himself as being "only dimly aware" before reading this article that there was a language other than English spoken on the Isle of Man. While still a student of Douglas High School for Boys he began attending lessons taught by Leslie Quirk, who introduced Stowell to Fargher, and in turn to other members of Yn Çheshaght Ghailckagh such as Walter Clarke and Bill Radcliffe. During this period he accompanied Fargher and other members of Yn Çheshaght Ghailckagh as they recorded the remaining elderly native speakers. He spent his weekends, meeting in Fargher's office in Douglas and conversing only in Manx. After about nine months he became fluent.

Although Stowell did have regular access to proficient speakers through Yn Çheshaght Ghailckagh, he found it difficult to access resources to learn the language, as well as hostile attitudes from non-Manx speaking members of the community:

A deterrent at that time (and for a very long time after that) would have been the aggressive attitude of most other people: ‘What do you want to waste your time with that old nonsense for? That was never a real language!’ This was like some sort of fixed mantra.

Manx disappeared as a community language on most of the Isle of Man in the late 19th century. It was a low prestige language and negative attitudes by much of the Island's population towards Manx posed significant difficulty for learners and established speakers alike:

"In the 1860s there were thousands of Manx people who couldn't speak English," says Stowell. "But barely a century later it was considered to be so backwards to speak the language that there were stories of Manx speakers getting stones thrown at them in the towns.

== Life in Liverpool ==
In 1955 Stowell moved to Liverpool to study physics at the University of Liverpool. He met Pat Price, who became his first wife and mother to his two eldest children. After graduation Stowell worked as a physics teacher in a secondary school in Liverpool which he hated.

He later worked at the United Kingdom Atomic Energy Authority. During this time, Stowell kept some of his sensitive research notes in Manx, knowing that he was the only person in the world who could understand them fully, often creating new scientific terms.

While living in Liverpool he attended Irish language classes arranged by Conradh na Gaeilge, as he felt that they were "the next best thing to Manx." Stowell ultimately became fluent in Irish and taught classes in the language in Liverpool, although not without difficulty during the Troubles:

And when the troubles came in Northern Ireland it was a bit difficult because people threatened the office in Liverpool about the class in Irish and it was….well they had to laugh in the end because I said, ‘Change the name to Celtic Studies,’ and they did that and they made other threats because they thought that was the football club Celtic in Glasgow.

Stowell eventually used his experience learning and teaching Irish to translate the Irish language course Buntús Cainte into Manx, which became Bunneydys for the Manx language learning community.

He gained a PhD in applied physics while lecturing at Liverpool John Moores University and became head of department. While lecturing in Liverpool, he taught Manx to Phil Gawne and Adrian Cain, who would both later hold the position of Manx Language Officer after Stowell was appointed in 1991.

In 1990, Stowell published Contoyrtyssyn Ealish ayns Çheer ny Yindyssyn, his translation into Manx of Alice's Adventures in Wonderland.

Stowell's first marriage broke down in the mid-1970s and he married his second wife Julia Berney in 1982, with whom he had two girls.

== Return to Mann ==
Stowell was appointed Manx Language Officer in 1991 and returned to the Isle of Man permanently with his family the same year.

The allocation of increased funding for the Manx language and the passing of the 2001 Education Act that allowed for the Manx language, its literature, and Manx history to be taught on the island's schools which in turn caused a drastic shift in attitudes towards the language:

There has been a big change for you wouldn't, well I couldn't believe it, without doubt 50 years ago, 40 years ago, even 20 years ago, that a great change would come and for the most part that is on account of money from the Government. That's the main thing.

He made weekly broadcasts about history and current events on long-running, bilingual Manx Radio programme Moghrey Jedoonee for over 20 years. In March 2006 Stowell's Dunveryssyn yn Tooder-Folley ("The Vampire Murders"), the first recorded full-length novel in Manx, was published despite the small numbers who could read fluently in Manx:

The potential readership is very low indeed – only about 200 people can read it without much difficulty. You could rationalise why I went ahead by saying, “oh, it will be used for studying Manx.” But I never had that in mind at all. I just thought it'd be a great laugh to write a novel in Manx.

Stowell died on 18 January 2019 after a period of ill health.

== Legacy ==
In 2008, Stowell was awarded Culture Vannin's Reih Bleeaney Vanannan ("Manannan's Choice of the Year") award for outstanding contributions to Manx culture. On Tynwald Day 2010, he was awarded the Tynwald Honour, the highest honour that Tynwald can award a citizen.

The Aundyr Brian Stowell ("The Brian Stowell Award") was created in memory of Stowell's achievements. It is awarded by the Manx language group, Pobble, for any piece of creative work produced in Manx.

His autobiography Gaelg as Fishig: Skeeal my Vea ("Manx and Physics: The Story of my Life") was published posthumously in 2019.

== List of works ==
- 1968: Gaelg Trooid Jallooghyn: Manx Through Pictures
- 1973: Chronicle of The Kings of Mann and The Isles / Recortys Reeaghyn Vannin as ny hEllanyn with George Broderick
- 1974: Bunneydys: A Course in Spoken Manx (based on Buntús Cainte)
- 1986: Abbyr Shen!
- 1990: Contoyrtyssyn Ealish ayns Çheer ny Yindyssyn
- 1996: Bun-Choorse Gaelgagh
- 1996: A Short History of the Manx Language
- 1998: Y Coorse Mooar
- 2005: Dunveryssyn yn Tooder-Folley (a serial story)
- 2006: Ealish ayns Çheer ny Yindyssyn
- 2020: Gaelg as Fishig - Skeeal my Vea
