= Bill Radcliffe =

Manx language speaker and teacher

- Born: John William Radcliffe; 16 August 1917
- Died: 28 January 1984 (aged 66); Ramsey, Isle of Man
- Other name: Illiam y Radlagh
- Organisation: Yn Çheshaght Ghailckagh
- Known for: Promotion of the Manx language
- Spouse: Constance Radcliffe (m. 1957–1984)

John William Radcliffe (16 August 1917 – 28 January 1984), more commonly known as Bill Radcliffe, or also Illiam y Radlagh, was a Manx language activist, author, and teacher who was involved with the revival of the Manx language on the Isle of Man in the 20th century. His work recording the last native speakers of the language with the Irish Folklore Commission helped to ensure that a spoken record of the Manx language survived.

== Manx language ==
Bill Radcliffe was one of the several active Manx speakers who learned the language from the diminishing number of elderly native speakers on the Isle of Man in the first half of the 20th century. Along with several other Manx speakers such as Doug Fargher, Charles Craine, and Leslie Quirk, Radcliffe learned Manx by travelling around the Manx countryside, visiting the elderly native Manx speakers and learning directly from them.

These learners were part of a small tight-knit group of high level speakers who would go on to be vital members of Yn Çheshaght Ghailckagh, but also the language revival movement. The group would be a crucial link between the last generation of native speakers, and those who learned Manx after the death of Ned Maddrell in 1974.

Like many of his generation, Radcliffe spent many years teaching Manx to learners particularly in the north of the Island. He was still actively teaching students Manx just a few days before his death.

== Irish Folklore Commission recordings ==
In the summer of 1947 Irish Taoiseach Éamon de Valera visited the Isle of Man. The Taoiseach was a fluent Irish speaker himself and was greatly interested in Gaelic and Celtic cultures. In Ireland, de Valera had been instrumental in setting up the Irish Folklore Commission in 1935 which recorded not only living and dying Irish dialects, but also Irish folklore and customs. As part of his trip to the Isle of Man, de Valera had a conversation with Ned Maddrell, the youngest of the last remaining native speakers, with Maddrell speaking Manx and de Valera speaking Irish.

During his trip, the Taoiseach heard that the Manx language had dwindled down to a few elderly speakers, but that the Manx Museum did not have the facilities or funds to record and preserve the last speakers of the language. On his request, Kevin Danaher of the Irish Folklore Commission travelled to the Isle of Man with a crate of fragile acetate discs to record the last remaining native speakers on 22 April 1948. Radcliffe along with Walter Clarke helped to transport the recording equipment and acted as a guide for Danaher, bringing him to the remote and isolated locations where the informants lived. They assisted Danaher and spent considerable time before every recording carefully balancing the equipment with a spirit level and connecting batteries and converters as many of the informants did not have electricity. As Radcliffe was familiar with the elderly native speakers and met them many times, he can be heard on several of the recordings speaking to them.

After the visit by the Irish Folklore Commission, Radcliffe and other members of Yn Çheshaght Ghailckagh continued to record the remaining native speakers despite technical and financial restraints: "We just – we wanted to record the old people but we didn’t, we had neither the money nor the means of doing it". Eventually they were able to make these recordings, albeit often at significant financial expense to themselves; John Gell for example loaned them £8 to purchase the necessary equipment.

== Other interests ==
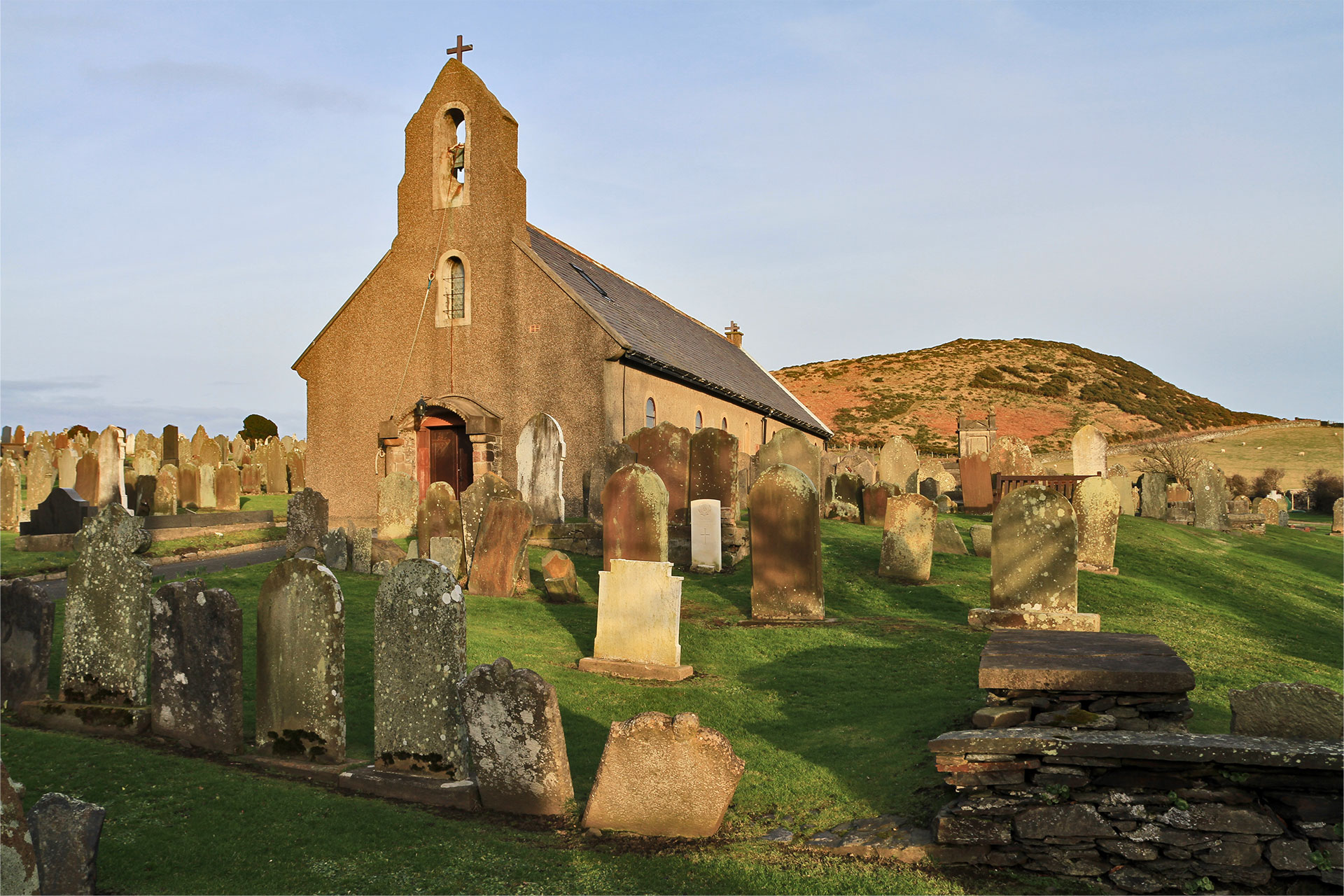
Kirk Maughold parish church where Radcliffe was married.

Radcliffe spent most of his life as a coal merchant in Ramsey, in the north of the Isle of Man. He married Manx historian and teacher Constance Curphey in Kirk Maughold parish church on 15 August 1957.

He was a keen local historian and a member of the board of trustees of the Manx Museum. After his retirement, he focused on writing and co-wrote History of Kirk Maughold, Maughold and Ramsey Place-names, and Kirk Bride: A Miscellany with his wife.

Radcliffe took over the role of Yn Lhaihder at the Tynwald Day ceremony from Charles Craine in 1978 and continued in that role until his death. This is a centuries old tradition that required Radcliffe to read out new laws that were to be promulgated in the Manx language on Tynwald Hill.

== Legacy ==
Radcliffe's work inspired a new generation of Manx speakers. Brian Stowell first learned Manx by spending time with him and others members of Yn Çheshaght Ghailckagh who learned Manx from the last native speakers.:

For weekend after weekend I was immersed in hours of spoken Manx, meeting Doug Fargher, Walter Clarke, Leslie Quirk and Bill Radcliffe, and occasionally going out with them when they were recording native speakers. For a long time, I could understand only a few words, then a few sentences, and then more and more.

Stowell would go on to be one of the most important figures in the modern Manx revival movement.

Radcliffe's contribution to his native area and the language of the Isle of Man was celebrated with a Manx language plaque on Court Row in Ramsey, by Yn Çheshaght Ghailckagh.
