= Doug Fargher =

Manx language activist and lexicographer

- Doolish y Karagher
- Born: 1926
- Died: 1987 (aged 60–61)
- Other name: Yn Breagagh
- Organization(s): Yn Çheshaght Ghailckagh, Mec Vannin
- Known for: Promotion of the Manx language
- Notable work: English-Manx Dictionary (1979)
- Spouse: Joyce Barry

Doug Fargher (1926–1987) also known as Doolish y Karagher or Yn Breagagh (The Liar), was a Manx language activist, author, and radio personality who was involved with the revival of the Manx language on the Isle of Man in the 20th century. He is best known for his English-Manx Dictionary (1979), the first modern dictionary for the Manx language. Fargher was involved in the promotion of Manx language, culture and nationalist politics throughout his life.

== Personal life ==
Fargher was born in 1926 to William and Catherine Fargher of Glencrutchery Road in Douglas on the Isle of Man.

He married Joyce Barry in 1954 at Kirk Braddan church in a ceremony conducted in Manx by Rev. William Wood. In 1956 Fargher and his wife left the Isle of Man to work in Zambia (then Northern Rhodesia) as an overseer in the copper mines. They did not return to the Isle of Man until 1963. On his return to the Isle of Man, Fargher ran a fruit importing business on Ridgeway Street in Douglas.

== Early Years with the Manx Language ==
Douglas Fargher was one of the several active Manx speakers who learned the language from the diminishing number of elderly native speakers on the Isle of Man in the 1940s and 1950s. Along with Manx speakers such as Walter Clarke and Leslie Quirk, Fargher travelled around the Manx countryside on bicycles, visiting the native Manx speakers and learning the language from them.

The following year after a visit by Irish Taoiseach Éamon de Valera to the Isle of Man in 1947, the Irish Folklore Commission was tasked with recording the remaining native speakers as the Manx Museum did not have the facilities or funds to do so. This inspired Fargher and his group of Manx speaking friends to make their own recordings themselves, despite technical and financial restraints: "we wanted to record the old people but we didn’t, we had neither the money nor the means of doing it". Eventually they were able to make these recordings, albeit often at significant financial expense to themselves; John Gell for example, loaned them the £8 to purchase the necessary equipment.

Manx had traditionally been a low prestige language and negative attitudes by much of the Island's population towards the Manx language still posed significant difficulty for learners and established speakers alike:

A deterrent at that time (and for a very long time after that) would have been the aggressive attitude of most other people: ‘What do you want to waste your time with that old nonsense for? That was never a real language!’ This was like some sort of fixed mantra.

Despite these deterrents, Fargher encouraged his fellow Manxmen and new residents of the Isle of Man to join in his "crusade for maintaining and using the Manx language". Fargher organised Methodist church services through Manx to raise the profile of the language. For much of the 1950s he was also a regular contributor to the Manx language column Coraa ny Gael (Voice of the Gael) in Manx newspaper Mona's Herald. Fargher often under the pen name Yn Breagagh, a name which was taken from one of his grandfathers.

== Return to Mann and later years ==
Fargher and his wife left for Zambia in 1956, and did not return to the Isle of Man until 1963. When he returned, he committed himself to rebuilding the Manx language revival movement which had been nearly stagnant for much of this period, as noted by Fargher's friend and fellow Manx speaker and member of Yn Çheshaght Ghailckagh:

According to Walter Clarke of the Manx Museum, a member of the society, there is very little enthusiasm for the language in Man to-day [sic]. “People think they can pick up Manx in six easy lessons,” he said. “when they find they can’t they lose interest.” Evening classes in the main towns were abandoned recently, and so was the society’s Manx journal Coraa Ghailckagh. An effort to get Manx taught in schools also failed.

After a low point in the numbers of Manx speakers in the 1961 census, the 1960s and 1970s saw a renewed interest in the Manx language across the island. Fargher also helped to reinvigorate Yn Çheshaght Ghailckagh when he was elected to the committee in 1972, by organising Oieghyn Gaelgagh (Manx Language Nights) and publishing new learner material. He also started broadcasting a weekly 'listen and learn' radio programme in which he taught the lessons from John Gell's Conversational Manx to listeners. These initiatives helped to attract new young learners to the language movement. In 1966 Irish national broadcaster RTÉ's Cathal O'Shannon interviewed Fargher as part of their Newsbeat programme to document the resurgence in interest in Manx language activity, acknowledging the difficulty in the task of reviving Manx:

We're trying to give our nation back its language; it may be a long uphill struggle, but I think in the final analysis we will definitely achieve this object – perhaps not in my lifetime, but perhaps in the lifetime of those following after us.

On Sunday 11 October 1970 Fargher read the first ever news report in the Manx language on Manx Radio. He released Undin, the spoken dictionary, as an audio resource to help learners to pronounce Manx correctly, on behalf of Yn Çheshaght Ghailckagh.

== English-Manx Dictionary (1979) ==
Fargher spent many years compiling his dictionary. He was keen to avoid the inclusion of English idioms and calques, even if they had been used by the last native speakers, and so looked to create new terminology and words. He described his approach in the preface to his dictionary:

It always appalled me to hear the last few native speakers interspersing accounts of their travels in Manx with the anglicised renderings of Gaelic names. This unnecessary dependence upon English cannot be tolerated if the Manx language of the future is to survive in its own right, and has, therefore been discouraged here.

He often looked to Ireland and the Irish language (which enjoyed the state support that Manx did not) for inspiration for the creation of new words and idioms. Fargher described Ireland as being the Manx language movement's "spiritual and cultural motherland". The dictionary was published in 1979 and was directly compared with Irish lexicographer Tomás de Bhaldraithe's English-Irish Dictionary (1959).

Although Fargher wrote the first modern dictionary for the Manx language, he was not the first Manxman to write one. Reverend John Kelly attempted to do so in his A Triglot Dictionary of the Celtic Language, as spoken in Man, Scotland, and Ireland together with the English, but much of this was destroyed in a fire during publishing in 1807. Archibald Cregeen spent decades writing his A Dictionary of the Manks Language (1838) but was not aware of Kelly's dictionary, as although it was partially extant in manuscript form, it was not published until decades later in 1866. Rev. William Wood also published a small dictionary for school students of Manx in 1950.

== Other interests ==
In 1962, along with fellow Manx speakers Lewis Crellin and Bernard Moffatt, Fargher was one of the first members of Mec Vannin, a small political party aimed at gaining full independence and establishing the Isle of Man as an independent sovereign state. He described the early 1960s as a period of "great reawakening of national consciousness" and he believed that the language should be the basis of this new nationalist movement. He believed that the Manx people (like the other Celtic nations) had an "inferiority complex about their own nationality and their language" and noted that the greatest enthusiasts for Manx Independence were Manx speakers.

Fargher was also interested in Manx songs and music. In 1979 he provided the Manx translations for Five Manx Folk Songs, similar to Mona Douglas' Five Manx Folk Dances.

After the death of fellow Manx speaker Bill Radcliffe in 1984, Fargher took over the role of Yn Lhaihder for Tynwald until his death. This required him to read out in the Manx language a brief summary of the new laws that were to be promulgated at Tynwald Hill.

== Legacy ==
Fargher's work inspired a new generation of Manx speakers. Brian Stowell was motivated to learn Manx when he read an article written by Fargher defending the Manx language in late 1953. After attending lessons taught by Leslie Quirk, he was then introduced in person to Fargher, and in turn to other members of Yn Çheshaght Ghailckagh such as Walter Clarke and Bill Radcliffe. Brian Stowell went on to be one of the most important figures in the modern Manx revival movement.

After Fargher read the first news report in Manx on Manx Radio 1970, there are now weekly radio shows and podcasts in the language, and Manx greetings are used to begin and end every news report.

In the decades since the Fargher's dictionary was published, it has become a vital source for learners of Manx, and after his death: "His great dictionary serves as a practical memorial of this great Manx patriot." The dictionary and the neologisms that he created for it, have become a source of academic debate in and of itself.
