= Manx literature =

Literature in the Manx language

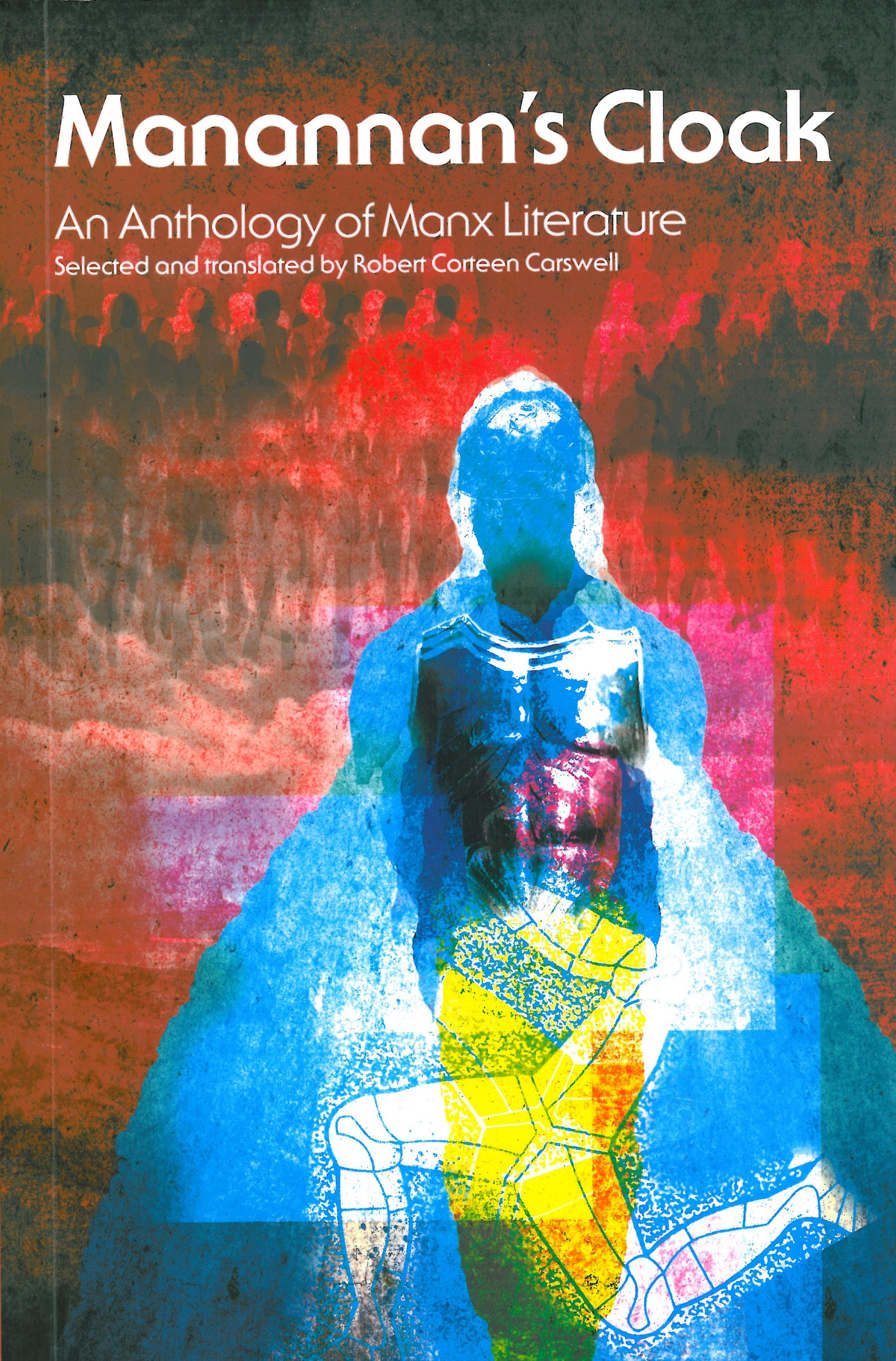
'Manannan's Cloak: An Anthology of Manx Literature' edited by Robert Corteen Carswell

Literature in the Manx language is known from the 16th century. Early works were often religious in theme, including translations of the Book of Common Prayer, the Bible and Milton's Paradise Lost. Edward Faragher (Neddy Beg Hom Ruy; 1831–1908), who published poems, stories and translations, is considered the last major native writer of the language. The historian A. W. Moore collected traditional Manx-language songs and ballads in publications towards the end of the 19th century.

Yn Çheshaght Ghailckagh, the Manx Language Society, was founded at the end of the 19th century. The revival of Manx has resulted in new original works and translations being published in the late 20th and early 21st centuries, with authors including Brian Stowell (1936–2019) and Robert Corteen Carswell (born 1950).

== Religious literature ==
The earliest datable text in Manx (preserved in 18th century manuscripts), a poetic history of the Isle of Man from the introduction of Christianity, dates to the 16th century at the latest.

Christianity has been an overwhelming influence on Manx literature. Religious literature was common, but surviving secular writing was much rarer. The New Testament was first published in 1767. The Book of Common Prayer and Bible were translated into Manx and published in 1610 and again in 1765. The first Manx Bible was printed between 1771 and 1775 and is the source and standard for modern Manx orthography. It was a collective translation undertaken by most of the Manx clergy under the editorship of Philip Moore. Further editions followed in 1777 and a revised edition by the British and Foreign Bible Society in 1819. A tradition of carvals, religious songs or carols, developed, probably with its roots in the pre-Reformation period. Until the 18th century, the authors of carvals were generally clergy, but in the 19th century new words would be put to popular tunes for use in churches and chapels.

The first printed work in Manx, Coyrle Sodjeh, dates from 1707: a translation of a Prayer Book catechism in English by Bishop Thomas Wilson.

Pargys Caillit was an abridged Manx version of Paradise Lost by John Milton published in 1796 by Thomas Christian, vicar of Marown 1780–1799.

== 19th century ==
Edward Faragher, (Neddy Beg Hom Ruy, 1831–1908) of Cregneash has been considered the last important native writer of Manx. From the age of 26, he wrote poetry, often on religious subjects, some of which were printed in the Mona's Herald and the Cork Eagle. Some of his stories are reminiscences of his life as a fisherman, and Skeealyn Aesop, translations of selected Aesop's Fables, was published in 1901.

Many traditional Manx language songs and ballads were collected by the antiquarian and historian A. W. Moore and published in his Manx Carols (1891) and Manx Ballads and Music (1896).

== Modern literature ==
Yn Çheshaght Ghailckagh (the Manx Language Society) has worked closely with Culture Vannin (formerly the Manx Heritage Foundation) in the publication of literature in the Manx language.

With the revival of Manx, new literature has appeared, including Contoyryssyn Ealish ayns Cheer ny Yindyssyn, a Manx translation of Alice in Wonderland by Brian Stowell, published in 1990. In March 2006 the first full-length Manx novel was published: Dunveryssyn yn Tooder-Folley (The Vampire Murders), also by Brian Stowell.

== See also ==
- Gaelic literature
- Irish literature
- Literature in the other languages of Britain
- Scottish literature
