= Yn Lhaihder =

Yn Lhaihder (Manx: [ən ˈlʲaɪdðəɾ], "The Reader") is an official who takes part in the annual Tynwald Day ceremony at St John's, Isle of Man. After the Coroner of Glenfaba "fences the Court" (brings the Court to order) in English, Yn Lhaihder repeats the same declaration in Manx.

The role of Yn Lhaihder is central to reaffirming the Manx identity of the proceedings of Tynwald Day.

The role of the Lhaihder has varied somewhat since it was instituted.

The First Deemster proclaims the laws and a brief summary of them in English, and the Second Deemster then does so in Manx. Under the Promulgation Act 1988, a summary of each law, as described above, must be read out in both languages within 18 months of it being passed. There is no mention of who should perform this function.

== History ==
The Coroner of Glenfaba is the most senior Coroner, and traditionally read the laws in Manx. William Kermode did so from 1888 to 1906 (except that in 1898, in contrast to today's packed legislative programme, there were no laws to promulgate). He was Coroner of Glenfaba for most of that time, but was instead Coroner of Michael in four of those years. Nevertheless, he continued to promulgate the laws in Manx on Tynwald Day: perhaps because the other officials (and specifically Philip Teare, who was Coroner of Glenfaba) did not speak Manx or maybe were unwilling to admit to speaking it.

After Kermode died in 1906, for the next three years (1907 to 1909) the laws were promulgated in Manx by A W Moore, Speaker of the House of Keys. Moore died in 1909, and in 1910, William Cashin was the first Lhaihder appointed to proclaim the laws.

When Yn Lhaihder was first appointed in 1910, he read out in Manx the name (short title) and a brief summary of each law to be promulgated. This continued until 1966. Since 1967 that task has been performed by the Second Deemster.

From 1967 to 1971 the then Lhaihder, Charles Craine, was present at the Tynwald Day ceremony but with minimal participation in it. In 1972 Mr Craine, as Lhaihder, fenced the Court in Manx after the retiring Coroner of Glenfaba had done so in English. Since then, that has been the role of Yn Lhaihder.

However, in the unusual circumstances of Tynwald Day 2020, with the ceremony being much reduced in scale due to the COVID pandemic, the Lhaihder, Bob Carswell, once again promulgated the laws in Manx.

List of Lhaihderyn
Date	Name
1910–1911	William Cashin
1912–1913	Robert Kerruish
1914–1917	William Quayle
1918–1937	John Kewley
1938–1961	Charles Alfred Cannan
1962–1978	Charles Craine
1978–1983	Bill Radcliffe
1984–1986	Doug Fargher
1987–2000	John Christian Crellin
2001–2012	Brian Stowell
2013–	Bob Carswell
