= Lewis Crellin =

Manx language speaker and scholar

- Lewis y Crellin
- Born: 1901; Foxdale, Isle of Man
- Died: 1990 (aged 88–89); Peel, Isle of Man
- Organization(s): Mec Vannin, Yn Çheshaght Ghailckagh
- Notable work: Skeealyn Lewis Crellin

Lewis Crellin (1901–1990) also known as Louis Crellin or Lewis y Crellin was a Manx language scholar and teacher who was involved with the revival of the Manx language on the Isle of Man in the 20th century and the Manx independence movement in the 1960s.

== Early life ==
Lewis Crellin was born in Foxdale on the Isle of Man, but was orphaned at an early age and raised by his grandparents. Although Crellin was raised in an area that still had a significant number of older Manx speakers, he took no interest in it himself until he was much older.

== Manx language ==
Crellin started learning Manx was he was nearly 40 years old. He learned Manx by visiting the elderly native speakers around the Island, who in turn introduced him to the small community of Manx language enthusiasts that included figures such as Walter Clarke, Doug Fargher, and Charles Craine. By this time Crellin was living in Peel and was attending Manx classes with the former Peel Harbour Master, Captain James Kinley, and Caesar Cashin. In later years, Crellin himself taught Manx classes in Peel and shared his knowledge of Manx history, folklore, and wildlife in summer walks that he led. He achieved a high standard of Manx and has been described as "one of the most enthusiastic and talented linguists of his generation."

== Other interests ==
Crellin also collected folklore and stories and wrote his research on them. He had a keen interest in horticulture, botany, ornithology, and astronomy and during his lifetime was considered an authority on "all things Manx". He was known for having a beautifully maintained garden where wild birds would come "to his hand to be fed."

He was a founding member of Mec Vannin, a small political party aimed at gaining full independence and establishing the Isle of Man as an independent sovereign state.

His collection of stories based on his own experiences, as well as a lifetime of research, was published by Yn Çheshaght Ghailckagh in 1976. Recordings were later made and distributed for free to accompany the book.
