= Constance Radcliffe =

Manx historian and author

- Born: Constance Curphey; 1921; Ramsey, Isle of Man
- Died: 6 January 2004 (aged 82–83); Ramsey, Isle of Man
- Education: Ramsey Grammar School; University of Liverpool
- Notable work: Shining by the Sea: A History of Ramsey 1800–1914
- Spouse(s): Bill Radcliffe (m. 1957; d. 1984)
- Awards: Reih Bleeaney Vanannan 1989 MBE 1996

Constance Radcliffe MBE RBV (1921 – 6 January 2004) was a Manx historian who wrote primarily about the history of the parish of Maughold and the town of Ramsey, both in the north of the Isle of Man. In 1989 Radcliffe was awarded the Reih Bleeaney Vanannan in recognition of her contribution to Manx culture, and was a recipient of the MBE in 1996.

== Early years ==
Radcliffe was born and raised in Ramsey, Isle of Man, the only child of coal merchant Alex Curphey of Ballajora and his wife. Her father was also keenly interested in local history and the Anglo-Manx dialect, and was considered "an authority on old Ramsey".

Radcliffe received her secondary education at Ramsey Grammar school, before moving to England to study at the University of Liverpool.

Radcliffe spent much of her professional life in education, teaching in the north of England, before returning to the Isle of Man and working at the Buchan School and at Ramsey Grammar School where she taught Latin and history.

She married Manx language scholar and activist Bill Radcliffe in Kirk Maughold parish church on 15 August 1957.

== Work as a historian ==
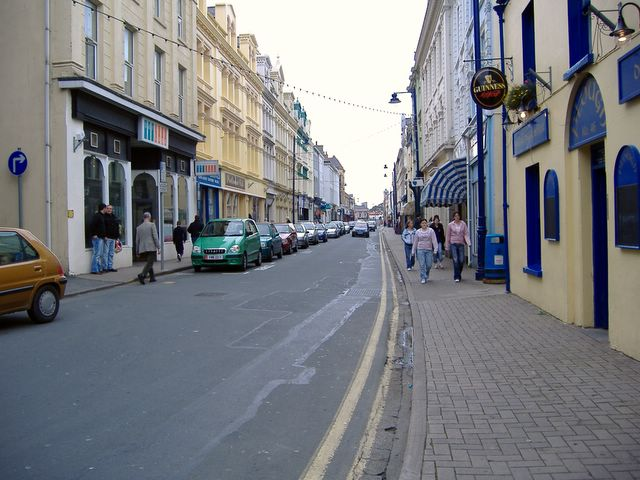
The town of Ramsey where Radcliffe lived in for most of her life.

Radcliffe was extensively on the history of the town of Ramsey and the surrounding parishes, writing the authoritative histories on the area. She was heavily involved in historical research of Manx history and was president of the Isle of Man Natural History and Antiquarian Society and a Trustee of Manx National Heritage along with her husband Bill.

After her husband's retirement, they focused on writing and co-wrote Maughold and Ramsey Place-Names, A History of Kirk Maughold, and Kirk Bride: A Miscellany together. Following her husband's death, Radcliffe concentrated on researching the history of Ramsey. Her books Ramsey 1600–1800 and Shining by the Sea: A History of Ramsey 1800–1914 (published in 1986 and 1989), respectively) are considered the authoritative accounts of the town.

Radcliffe also did significant genealogical work on several Manx families, often helping visitors to the island who wanted to research their connections to the Isle of Man.

In 1997, Radcliffe published Captains of the Parish: A History of this Ancient Manx Appointment, which discussed the history of the office of the Captain of the Parish, a ceremonial local government position that dates back to the Viking settlement of the Isle of Man.

== Anglo-Manx dialect ==
Like her father, Radcliffe was interested in the dialect of English spoken on the Isle of Man, that was heavily influenced by the Manx language. In 1986, she made cassette recordings of Manx dialect poets and authors Josephine Kermode (better known by her pen name "Cushag"), T. E. Brown, Juan Noa, Hilda Cowin, and personal friend Kathleen Faragher. All were associated with Ramsey other than T. E. Brown. Apart from writing in the distinctive Anglo-Manx dialect, the authors also described a "Manx way of life which has only just disappeared".

In 1993, she published Them ‘Oul Times: Poems by Cushag, which helped to reintroduce the poetry of Josephine Kermode and the Anglo-Manx dialect to a new generation. She praised Kermode's poetry, stating that:

The knowledge and deep love of the Island she displayed in her verses not only brought warm praise within its shores, but caused her work to be highly valued wherever Manx emigrants retained fond recollections of their homeland.

== Legacy ==
Radcliffe has been described by Manx cultural organisation Culture Vannin as "one of the Isle of Man's greatest ever historians". Her work on authors who wrote in the dialect of English spoken on the Isle of Man helped to preserve the features of the dialect for future generations. In 1989, Culture Vannin awarded Radcliffe the Reih Bleeaney Vanannan in recognition of her contribution to Manx culture and in 1996 she was a recipient of the MBE for her lifetime of contributions to the Isle of Man.

== Major published works ==
- 1978 – Maughold and Ramsey Place-Names
- 1979 – A History of Kirk Maughold
- 1982 – Kirk Bride: A Miscellany
- 1986 – Ramsey 1600–1800
- 1989 – Shining by the Sea: A History of Ramsey 1800–1914
- 1993 – Them ‘Oul Times: Poems by Cushag
- 1997 – Captains of the Parish: A History of this Ancient Manx Appointment
