= Reih Bleeaney Vanannan =

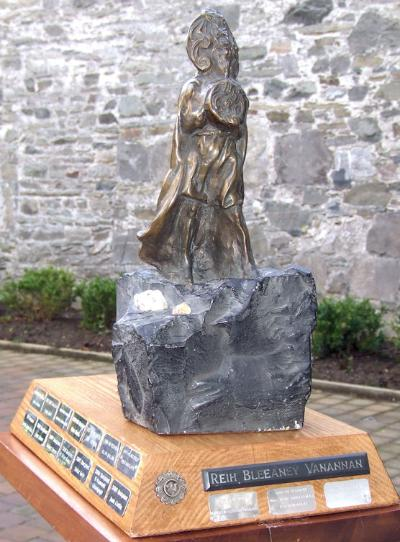
The Reih Bleeaney Vanannan trophy

The Reih Bleeaney Vanannan (Manx: [raɪ bliːənə vənænən], RYE BLEE-en-er va-NAN-nan, lit. 'Manannan's Choice of the Year') is the Isle of Man's most prestigious and highest national award for culture, it is awarded annually. It is presented by Culture Vannin to the person or group who has made the most outstanding contribution to Manx culture. It is typically presented by the President of Culture Vannin in January.

Recipients of the Reih Bleeaney Vanannan are entitled to use the letters RBV after their name. They hold the trophy for one year, as well as receiving a medal and a donation to be split between themselves and a Manx cultural cause of their choice.

The RBV was first awarded in 1987 as part of Culture Vannin's overarching policy "to support and promote Manx culture," as established at its creation in 1982 under its original name, the Manx Heritage Foundation. The panel of assessors for the award is appointed by Culture Vannin and represents the key Manx cultural organisations. The panel consists of representatives from Yn Çheshaght Ghailckagh, Yn Chruinnaght, the Isle of Man Arts Council, Culture Vannin and Manx National Heritage. Nominations are invited from the public in November of each year.

The RBV trophy consists of the figure of the sea-god Manannan standing on a piece of Pooilvaaish marble, resting on a plinth. It also contains traces of quartz from the South Barrule, one of Manannan's fortresses, and a brooch of Laxey silver in the form of the Three Legs of Man presented by Mona Douglas. It was designed by the late Eric Austwick. The medal presented to each recipient is designed by Jennie Kissack and executed in silver and enamel by Tony Lewis of Peel.

== Recipients of the Reih Bleeaney Vanannan award ==
Recipients of the Reih Bleeaney Vannanan Award
1	Maureen Costain Richards	1986
2	Mona Douglas	1989
3	Constance Radcliffe	1990
4	Geoffrey Crellin	1991
5	Colin Jerry	1992
6	John Gelling	1993
7	Robert Thomson	1994
8	Jane Narasimham	1995
9	Mike Boulton	1996
10	Leslie Quirk	1997
11	Fred Radcliffe	1998
12	Allan Skillan	1999
13	Tony Hopson	2000
14	Walter Clarke	2001
15	Marshall Cubbon	2002
16	Frank Cowin	2003
17	Leslie Quilliam	2004
18	Juan Crellin	2005
19	Bunscoill Ghaelgagh	2006
20	Dollin Kelly	2007
21	Brian Stowell	2008
22	Robert Farrer	2009
22	Joan Caine	2010
23	Fenella Bazin	2011
24	Manx Folk Dance Society	2012
25	Robert Corteen Carswell	2013
26	Clare Kilgallon	2014
27	William Cain	2015
28	Bernard Caine and John Kennaugh	2016
29	The Michael Players	2017
30	Phil Kelly	2018
31	John Kaneen	2019
32	Stephen Miller	2020
33	Peter Kelly	2021
34	Nigel Crowe	2022
35	Fiona McArdle	2023
36	Adrian Corkill	2024
37	Annie Kissack	2025
