= Sage Kinvig =

Native speaker of Manx (c. 1870–1962)

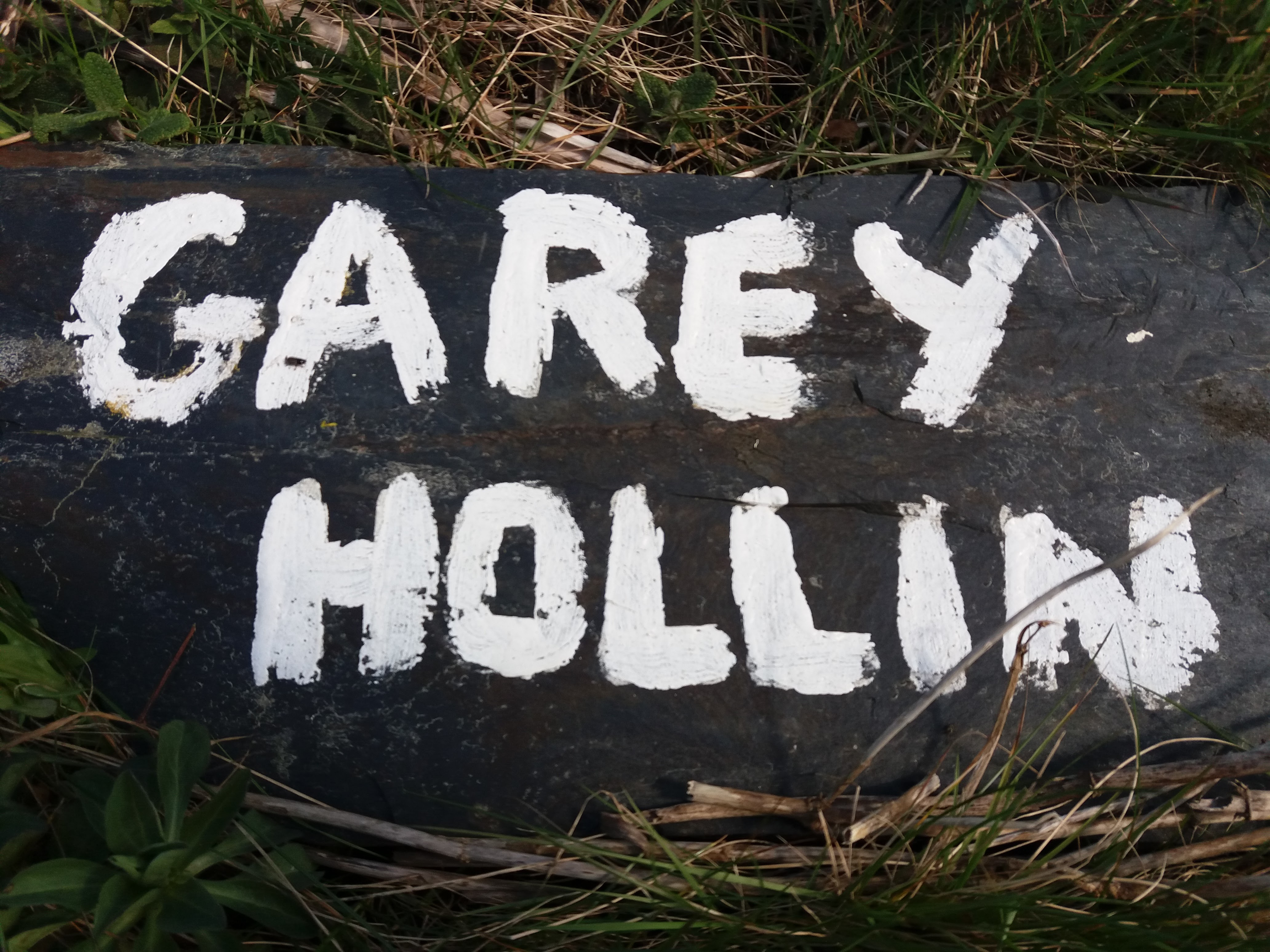
The sign of Sage Kinvig's home in Ronague

Sage Kinvig (c. 1870–1962) was, at the time of her death, one of the last surviving native speakers of the Manx language.

She was born Sage J. Clarke in around 1870 at Garey Hollin in Ronague, in the parish of Arbory, Isle of Man, following in the line of three generations of her family who had been born and raised there. She married John Kinvig (c. 1860–1953), who was at times fisherman, mason and Common Lands Inspector. After initially training in Castletown to become a dressmaker, Sage Kinvig eventually came to dedicate her time to maintaining the croft and raising their family of ten children.

Sage Kinvig and her husband were fluent native speakers of Manx, as was the norm for residents of Ronague in their youth. However, they witnessed the neglect of the language, and indeed took part in it, deciding not to teach the language to their children. At the time of her death in 1962, Sage Kinvig was believed to be one of only two living native Manx speakers, the other being Ned Maddrell, who died in 1974.

During her lifetime, she and others recognised her importance as a native Manx speaker. In April and May 1948, Kinvig was one of the Manx speakers recorded by the Irish Folklore Commission. This was instigated by Éamon de Valera, in order to preserve the speech of the remaining native speakers – a task neglected since it had been attempted by the Manx Language Society under the stewardship of Sophia Morrison in the 1900s and by Carl Marstrander in 1929–1933.

Together with her husband, Kinvig was an active participant in the revival of interest in Manx Gaelic in the 1950s and 1960s:

The Kinvigs were very conscious of the changes that had occurred in their lifetime and the threats these changes posed to the future of the Manx language. They were keen to encourage students of Manx Gaelic and many visited them to study pronunciation.

The Manx language has undergone a revival since her death, partly due to the support that Kinvig and others gave to younger learners of the language.
