= The Story of the Isle of Man =

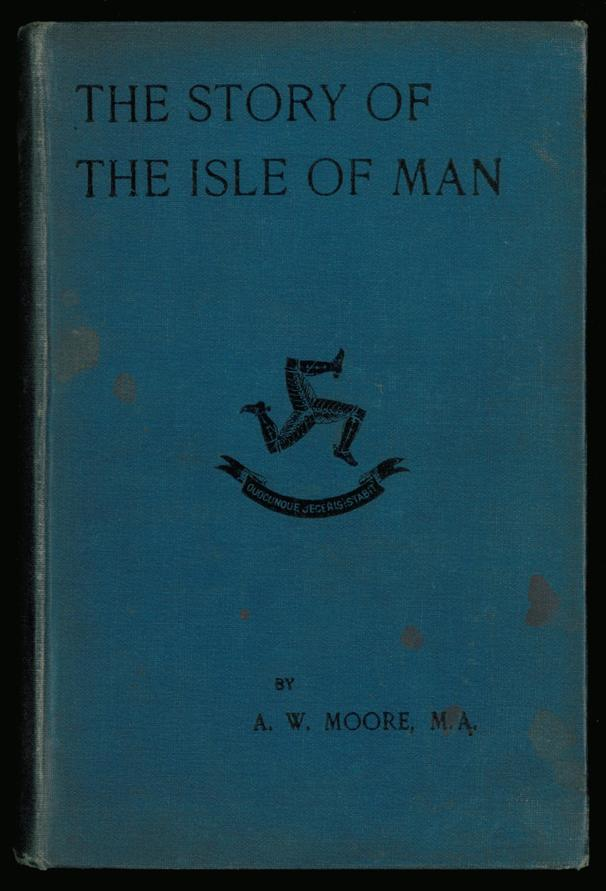
- The front cover of A. W. Moore’s book
- Author: Arthur William Moore
- Language: English
- Publisher: T. Fisher Unwin
- Publication date: 1901
- Publication place: UK
- Media type: Print (hardcover)
- Pages: 141 pp

The Story of the Isle of Man is a 1901 book on the history of the Isle of Man by A.W. Moore. It was written as an introduction to Manx history, specifically for children.

The book was written at a time of growing sense of Manx national identity, greatly due to the work of A. W. Moore himself. For want of any existing rigorous and sustained history of the Isle of Man, he wrote A History of the Isle of Man, which was published in 1900 in two volumes (reaching 989 pages). This book has remained the primary text for the history of Isle of Man since that time. The Story of the Isle of Man was published the following year, with the specific aim of offering an accessible shorter history of the island, suitable for use by children and teachers within Manx schools.

The book betrays the constitutional interests of Moore, then the Speaker of the House of Keys. The emphasis on the constitutional and legal aspects of Manx politics as drivers for history, rather than key influential individuals, is distinctive of Moore's approach to the history of the Isle of Man.

The structure of the book sets the landscape of Manx history as Moore saw it:

1. The Legends
2. The Norsemen
3. The House of Godred Crovan
4. Scottish and English Rule
5. The House of Stanley
6. The House of Atholl
7. Recent History

This function of The Story of the Isle of Man leads to a specifically pedagogical element to the book, which comes out in the tone, structure and the content of the work. Notable examples of this include the overtly moralistic tone and positivity about recent history, which Moore sees as marked by "reform and progress"; the listing of a number of "Manx Worthies" as good Manx citizens worthy of emulation; and, perhaps most clearly, in the seven duties of individuals towards the state that Moore concludes at the end of the book:

1. To maintain, and, if possible, to improve its Constitution.
2. To obey its laws.
3. To take care of public property.
4. To vote in elections.
5. To pay taxes.
6. To help to defend the State, when it is necessary.
7. If you have sufficient ability and leisure, it will be your duty to take office, whether it be as a member of a School Board, of a Parish or a Town Council, or of the House of Keys.

Although Moore's paramount importance as a historian of the Isle of Man remains unquestioned, as does the rigorousness of his work, contemporary historians of the island would question some of what appears in the book. Points at issue include the following:

- The positive tone in which “The Great Stanley“ is depicted, in contrast to Illiam Dhone.
- The choice of people involved in British colonial expansion as the "worthies" Moore holds up as exemplars for his readers to follow. These include William Kermode, one of the founders of the Colony of Tasmania, and Mark Cubbon, Commissioner of Mysore (1834-1861) during “the terrible mutiny.”
- The regular quotations from Wordsworth's Manx poems, generally considered to be of very low quality against his other work, and reverential references to Sir Walter Scott's Peveril of the Peak, while T. E. Brown is the only Manx writer mentioned, and even then merely as "the author of charming poems in which he describes [the Manx people’s] manners and customs".
