= Edmund Goodwin =

Manx language scholar

- Born: 24 August 1844; Peel, Isle of Man
- Died: 3 January 1925 (aged 80); Peel, Isle of Man
- Occupations: Music teacher, Manx language teacher
- Organisation: Yn Çheshaght Ghailckagh
- Notable work: First Lessons in Manx

Edmund Evans Greaves Goodwin (24 August 1844 – 3 January 1925) was a Manx language scholar, linguist, and teacher. He is best known for his work First Lessons in Manx that he wrote to accompany the classes he taught in Peel.

== Early life ==
Goodwin was born on 24 August 1844 at Castle Street, Peel to Englishman George Goodwin and his Manx wife Alice Morrison. In his early childhood, Goodwin contracted an illness that left him unable to walk, and he was an invalid for the rest of his life. Despite his disability, he was devoted to music and helped to support himself by teaching singing and piano to the music students of Peel and the surrounding areas. One of his best known students was Sophie Morrison, the Manx cultural activist, folklore collector and author. Under Goodwin's tuition, she received honours from Trinity College of Music, Morrison was the first person on the island to pass a music college examination.

Even as a youth, Goodwin was noted for his aptitude for learning languages:

At the age of twelve I picked up my first knowledge of German and French from old books which had belonged to my father. My first inducement to learn Latin and Italian was to be able to understand the words of Mozart’s Masses and Italian opera libretti.

Throughout his life Goodwin would go on to have "good working knowledge" of sixteen languages and was able to read in several more.

== Anglo-Manx dialect ==
Goodwin was interested in the dialect of English spoken on the Isle of Man, that was heavily influenced by the Manx language. He contributed to the writing of A Vocabulary of the Anglo-Manx Dialect by collaborating with A.W. Moore and Sophia Morrison. His contribution consisted primarily in relation to phonology and the "putting the phonetic sounds to the words". He also listed the words alphabetically, added some of his own suggestions, and prepared the work for the press. The book was published in 1924 after Moore's death in 1909 and Morrison's in 1917.

== Manx language ==
Following the decline of Manx as a community language on the Isle of Man during the 19th century, interest in the language was renewed, most notably among educated men in the town of Peel, where it was still common to hear Manx spoken by the fishermen. Goodwin began learning Manx in the autumn of 1893 and although his illness confined him to his bed for much of his life, he nevertheless studied Manx grammar and idiom in great detail with the help of "dictionary and Scriptures".

Goodwin began teaching Manx in Peel, where the earliest iterations of First Lessons in Manx "for blackboard use" were written. Along with several other prominent members of the Manx language revival such as J. J. Kneen and Dr John Clague, Goodwin was a founding member of Yn Çheshaght Ghailckagh in 1899. A. W. Moore, the director of the Manx Museum and the first president of Yn Çheshaght Ghailckagh, was not concerned only with the preservation and promotion of the Manx language, but also with all things related to Manx culture:

Though called the Manx Language Society, it should, I think, by no means confine its energies to the promotion of an interest in the language, but extend them to the study of Manx history, the collection of Manx music, ballads, carols, folklore, proverbs, place-names, including the old field names which are rapidly dying out in a word, to the preservation of everything that IS distinctively Manx, and, above all, to the cultivation of a national spirit.

In 1901 his First Lessons in Manx under the Manx name Lessoonyn ayns Çhengey ny Mayrey Ellan Vannin ("Lessons in the mother tongue of the Isle of Man") was published to help the small but growing community of learners of the Manx language. The book was serialised in Manx newspaper Mona's Herald and is still in use by Manx students on the Isle of Man today.

== Published works ==
- 1901 - Lessoonyn ayns Çhengey ny Mayrey Ellan Vannin
- 1924 - A Vocabulary of the Anglo-Manx Dialect (with Sophia Morrison and A.W. Moore)
