= Tynwald Honour =

The Tynwald Honour is highest honour that Tynwald, the Manx parliament can bestow on an individual. It is officially presented on Tynwald Day in St John's on the Isle of Man. The Tynwald Honour is to be awarded to those who "have made an outstanding contribution to Manx life over a significant period of time and have demonstrated a selfless commitment in doing so."

The award is not given annually, but only when someone is deemed to meet the criteria by the Tynwald Management Committee.

The Tynwald Honour consists of a sterling silver medal with the three legs of Mann and the motto of the Manx coat of arms (Latin: Quocunque Jeceris Stabit, lit. 'Whithersoever you throw it, it will stand') in the Manx language (Manx: Raad erbee cheauys oo mee, hassym). The recipient of the Tynwald Honour also receives a vellum certificate and are entitled to use the abbreviation ‘TH’ after their name.

== Recipients of the Tynwald Honour ==
The Tynwald Honour
| Year | Recipients |
|---|---|
| 2007 | Norman Alexander Sayle |
| 2008 | Harvey Briggs |
| 2009 | Ian Qualtrough |
| 2010 | Brian Stowell |
| 2011 | William Cain |
| 2012 | J W Corrin |
| 2013 | Nadene Crowther |
| 2014 | Hector Duff |
| 2015 | Geoffrey Friend Karran |
| 2018 | Bill Dale |
| 2021 | Ian Cottier |
| 2026 | Peter Kelly |
