= Pop-Up Gaeltacht =

Grassroots movement to organise social gatherings for Irish speakers

- Tob-Ghaeltacht
- Pop-Up Gaeltacht logo
- Formation: 2017; 8 years ago
- Founder: Osgur Ó Ciardha, Peadar Ó Caomhánaigh
- Founded at: Dublin, Ireland
- Type: Non-governmental organisation
- Purpose: Irish language promotion Gaelic revival
- Official language: Irish
- Website: cnag.ie

A Pop-Up Gaeltacht (Irish tob-Ghaeltacht) is an informal gathering of Irish speakers of various abilities (often in a bar) where they can meet and talk in a convivial atmosphere. In Dublin such gatherings can number up to 300 people, and similar events have been held abroad.

The pioneers of the Pop-Up Gaeltacht were Osgur Ó Ciardha and Peadar Ó Caomhánaigh, language activists who established the first one in Dublin in 2017. The objective was to provide a space in which Irish speakers could chat freely without feeling obliged to switch to English for the benefit of any non-Irish speakers present.

In a study of the phenomenon Stiofán Seoighe has argued that such a project must be seen in the context of validation of the identity of non-traditional speakers of a minority language, and that this is a continuous process.

It has been estimated that there are about 200,000 daily and weekly speakers of Irish in Ireland, north and south, who are “nuachainteoirí” – i.e. not traditional native speakers. Of these, almost 15,000 live in Dublin, comprising almost 20% of daily speakers nationally. It was the intention of the founders of the Pop-Up Gaeltacht that even the less confident of those speakers should have a public space in which they could converse at their ease.

== Abroad ==
The Pop-Up Gaeltacht has found some popularity in America and elsewhere. In 2019 one was held in New York, and others have been held in La Jolla, Los Angeles and Washington, D.C. Still others have been held in Australia, the United Arab Emirates, Canada and Bolivia. The originators have estimated that there have been over 150 held world-wide.

The concept has also spread other minority languages. In 2019 on the Isle of Man, Manx Pop-up Gaeltaghts were held as part of the Cooish, a festival which promotes the Manx language, and by Pobble, a Manx language advocacy organisation and charity.
