= Pobble =

Manx language advocacy group

- English: People; Community; Folk
- Logo for Pobble
- Formation: 2013
- Type: Cultural movement, language movement
- Purpose: Promotion of Manx language.
- Headquarters: 9 The High Street, Port St. Mary, Isle of Man, IM9 5DP
- Region served: Isle of Man
- Website: Pobble

Pobble ("People; Community; Folk") is a Manx language advocacy group and charity that works to promote the Manx language as "a community asset" on the Isle of Man. Pobble has also awarded the Aundyr Brian Stowell ("The Brian Stowell Award") since 2019.

== Activities ==
Pobble was launched in Douglas in September 2013 with the aim to promote the use of the Manx language as a community language on the Isle of Man. The group also aims to increase the number of children receiving bilingual Manx language education by providing support to Mooinger Veggey and Bunscoill Ghaelgagh.

Pobble has arranged community events where Manx can be spoken in a casual setting such as a Pop-Up Gaeltaght.

In 2019 Pobble announced a buddy-system which pairs Manx language learners with more experienced speakers.

== Aundyr Brian Stowell ==
In 2019 the Aundyr Brian Stowell ("The Brian Stowell Award") was created in memory of the contribution of Brian Stowell to the Manx language. It is awarded for any piece of creative work produced in Manx:

an entry could be a poem, a story, a drama, a film, an audio recording, or a visual or musical piece with Manx text, or, for example, an article about the Manx language and history, a translation, a digital app, augmented reality, or a website service.

The competition awards £300 for the first prize, £200 for the second, and £100 for the third. The winner of the inaugural Aundyr Brian Stowell was announced at the Cooish Manx language festival.

Recipients of Aundyr Brian Stowell
Year	1st Prize	2nd Prize	3rd Prize
2019	Jo Callister	Jo Callister	Felicity Wood
2020	Vicky Webb		
