= Ned Maddrell =

Last native speaker of Manx (1877–1974)

- Born: Edward Maddrell; 20 August 1877; Corvalley, near Cregneash, Isle of Man
- Died: 27 December 1974 (aged 97); Isle of Man
- Occupation: Fisherman
- Known for: Being the last native speaker of Manx
- Spouse: Mary Margaret Skelly (m. 1906)

Edward Maddrell (20 August 1877 – 27 December 1974) was a Manx fisherman who, at the time of his death, was the last surviving native speaker of the Manx language.

== Life ==
Maddrell was born on 20 August 1877 at Corvalley, near Cregneash, on the Isle of Man, the son of Thomas Maddrell and Margaret Watterson. He spoke English until he moved to the village of Cregneash to live with relatives. It was here that Maddrell learned Manx, as his great-aunt Margaret Taubman could not speak English. Although Manx had begun to disappear as a community language for most of the Isle of Man in the second half of the 19th century, it lingered on slightly longer in some more remote areas such as Cregneash. Maddrell recalled having to act as an interpreter for the older inhabitants of the village who could not speak English.

At the age of 14, Maddrell began working as a cook on a fishing boat, sailing from Port St Mary to Kinsale in Ireland and to Shetland off Scotland in search of herring.

He married Mary Margaret Skelly of Croit-e-Caley on 3 January 1906.

He died on 27 December 1974, at the age of 97, and was buried in Rushen on 30 December.

== Irish Folklore Commission recordings ==
Irish Taoiseach Éamon de Valera visited the Isle of Man in the summer of 1947. The Taoiseach had been instrumental in setting up the Irish Folklore Commission in 1935, which recorded living and dying Irish dialects, but also folklore and customs. During his trip to the Isle of Man, de Valera met Ned Maddrell at Harry Kelly's cottage in the village of Cregneash.

As a result of his trip, the Taoiseach organised for Kevin Danaher of the Irish Folklore Commission to record the last remaining native speakers of Manx, as the Manx Museum did not have the facilities or funds to do so. Danaher travelled to the Isle of Man on 22 April 1948 with a crate of fragile acetate discs to record the Manx language. Maddrell, as well as several other elderly speakers, can be heard speaking or reciting songs in the recordings.

== Legacy ==
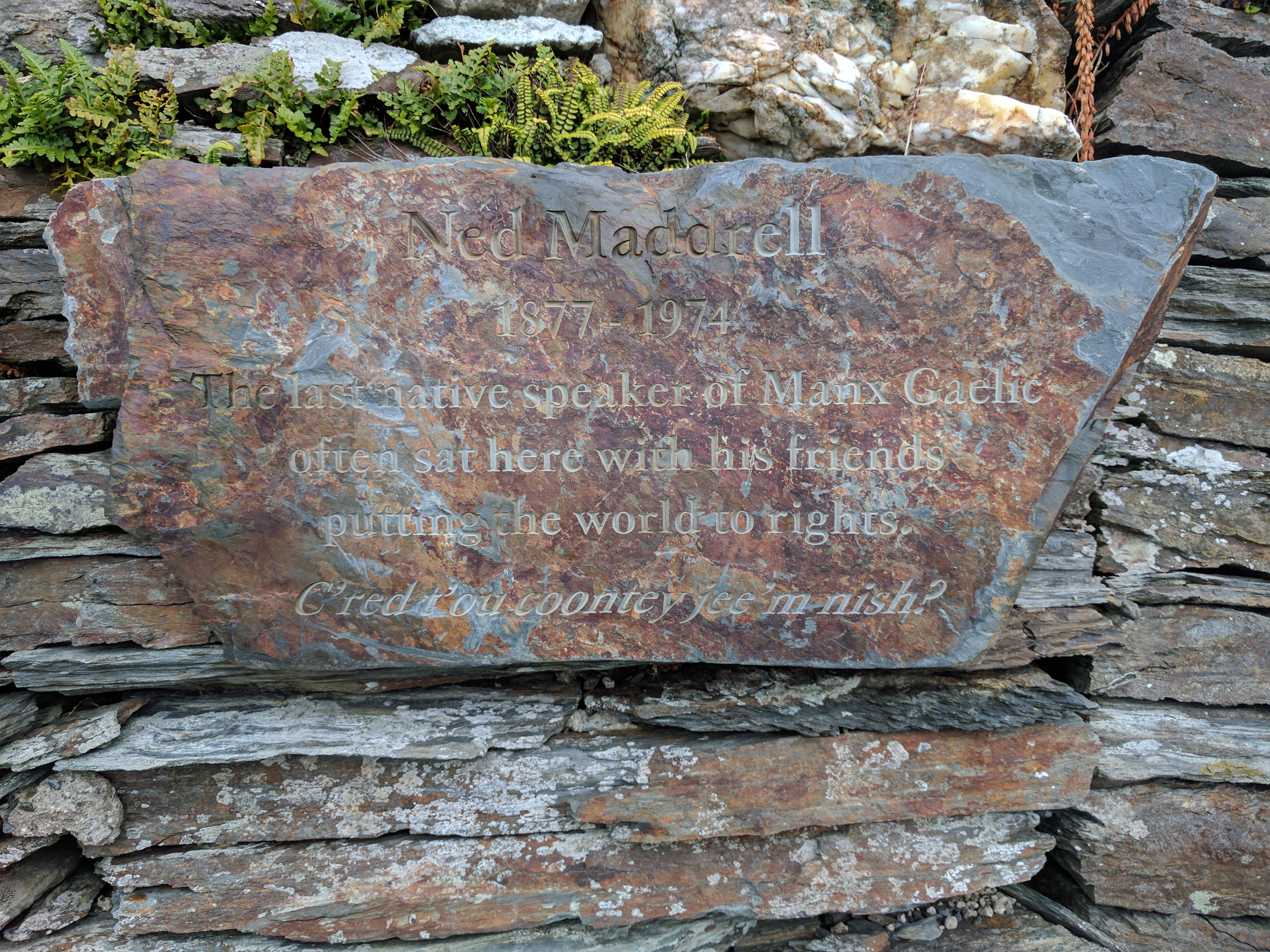
Commemorative plaque in Rushen

Following the death of Sage Kinvig (c. 1870–1962), Maddrell was the only remaining person who could claim to have spoken Manx Gaelic from childhood, although at the time some other people spoke it as a second language, having learned it later in life. (According to one source, Maddrell had some knowledge of English before he learned Manx, and learned Manx from his great-aunt.)

Maddrell recorded some of his speech for the sake of linguistic preservation; for example, in 1948 he recorded the following about fishing (in Manx, with the English translation):

Dooyrt "Ballooilley" rish:

"Ballooilley" said to him:

"Vel ny partanyn snaue, Joe?"

"Are the crabs crawling, Joe?"

"Cha nel monney, cha nel monney," dooyrt Joe. "T'ad feer ghoan."

"Not much, not much," said Joe. "They're very scarce."

A newspaper article about the decline of Manx from about 1960 (Maddrell's age was given as 82) mentions and quotes him, since at the time he was, along with Kinvig, one of only two native speakers:

Ned Maddrell, who went to sea at 13, found he was able to keep his Manx "alive" by talking to Gaelic-speaking sailors on British ships. He was brought up in the remote village of Cregneash, where "unless you had the Manx you were a deaf and dumb man and no good to anybody." This was not the case in the towns. "Nobody there wanted to talk Manx, even those who had it well. They were ashamed, like. 'It will never earn a penny for you,' they said." Ned is a sprightly old man, a trifle deaf but very proud of his role as one of the last native speakers. "They have tape recordings of me telling legends and stories in Manx," he said, "in Ireland and in America and in places you never heard of."

Maddrell appears to have enjoyed his minor celebrity status, and was very willing to teach younger language revivalists such as Leslie Quirk and Brian Stowell.

The Manx language has undergone a revival since his death, partly thanks to the support that Ned Maddrell gave to younger learners of the language toward the end of his life. Today he is remembered by an annual lecture on Celtic language survival hosted by Culture Vannin and Yn Çheshaght Ghailckagh.

== See also ==
- Sage Kinvig
- Tevfik Esenç, the last native speaker of Ubykh
- Doris McLemore, the last native speaker of Wichita
- Dolly Pentreath, the last native speaker of Cornish
- List of last known speakers of languages
