= Buntús Cainte =

Irish language educational television programme and book series

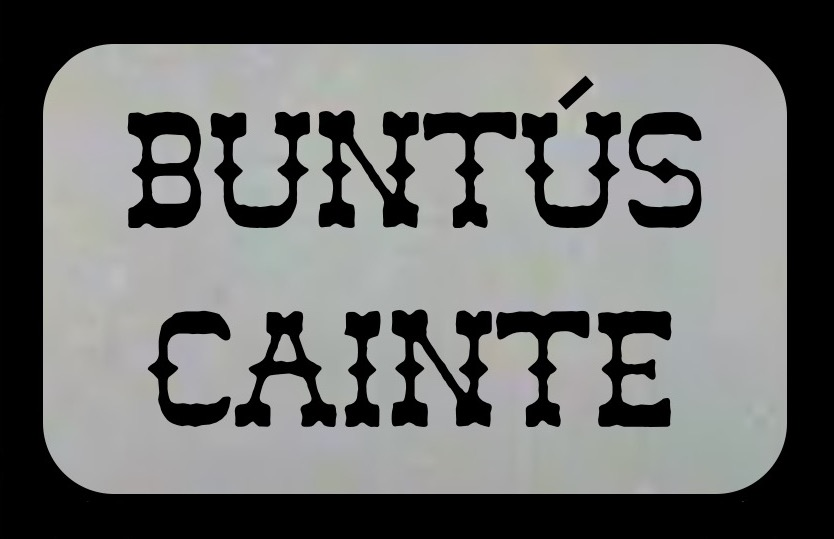
- Buntús Cainte title card
- Genre: Children's television series Educational
- Created by: Colmán Ó hUallacháin
- Written by: Tomás Ó Domhnalláin
- Presented by: Máire O’Neill and Aileen Geoghegan
- Country of origin: Ireland
- Original languages: Irish, English

Original release
- Release: 25 September 1967 – 1969

Buntús Cainte (Irish pronunciation: [bˠʊn̪ˠˌt̪ˠuːsˠ ˈkan̠ʲtʲə], lit. 'rudiments of speech') is a book series and an Irish-language learning television programme, written by Tomás Ó Domhnalláin in the mid-1960s, illustrated by William Bolger, and first published in a three volume series by the Stationery Office, Dublin, Ireland, in 1967. It was the brainchild of Franciscan priest Colmán Ó hUallacháin. It was re-printed eight times between 1974 and 1999 by the Stationery Office and since 2002, it has been re-printed seven times by An Gúm. The more recent re-prints are accompanied by a CD. Copyright is now held by Foras na Gaeilge.

The programme was broadcast on Raidió Teilifís Éireann in Ireland, beginning in 1967 until 1969. The show was designed to appeal to young viewers, and was lively and humorous. The programme was presented by Máire O’Neill and Aileen Geoghegan. By November 1967, 218,000 copies of the Buntús Cainte lessons booklet had been sold.

The programme catered to people with little or no Irish. Phrases were spoken by the presenters in both Irish and English, and were also overlaid (in Irish) on a simple static illustration by William Bolger relating to the phrase.

It is also the title of a series of 3 books which contain the programme material, including the cartoons, the spoken Irish words and the English and Irish text.

== Current publication ==
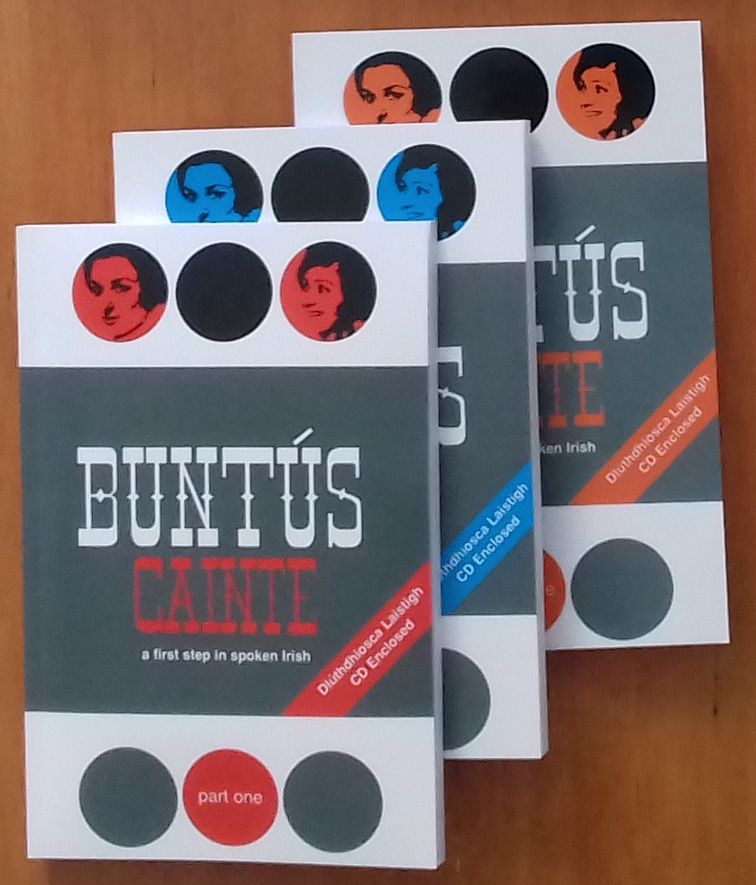
The three books that accompany the Buntús Cainte series.

Buntús Cainte is currently available in book form, published by Foras na Gaeilge with editions in 2002, 2005, 2006 and 2008. The current editions include remastered versions of the original recordings on Compact Disc.

Buntús Cainte is also available as an MP3 course for iPod, iPhone and iPad. The English and Irish text can be viewed by the learner using the lyrics function on the device.

== Format ==
The course consists of a series of short lessons in which the presenters speak in Irish. The lessons are accompanied by English and Irish written versions of the spoken words.

Each lesson contains new words, basic sentences for each of the new words, revisionary sentences, a second section of new material and a situational conversation. The book's lessons are intended to be used with recorded versions of the Irish words and sentences they contain. The current publications, unlike earlier ones, come with the recordings.

It is available as three books, Part One, Part Two and Part Three.

== Methodology ==
- The lessons are each intended to be a day's work.
- The student listens to the first part of the recording, dealing with new material, two or three times.
- On the second and subsequent times, the student repeats the Irish words aloud while reading the English equivalents.
- The student should then be able to understand the six basic sentences when heard for the first time.
- After listening to and repeating aloud the basic sentences the student should be able to reproduce them using only the stimulus provided by the cartoons.
- The revisionary sentences are then treated in a similar manner.
- The same approach is then taken with the second section of new material, and after that the situational conversation.
- Once the student can reproduce the Irish version of the conversation while glancing only at the English version for assistance they have mastered the lesson.
- Each day's work begins with an attempt to reproduce the previous day's situational conversation in the same way. If needed the recording can be played once or twice to aid recollection.
