= Walter Clarke (linguist) =

Manx language speaker and scholar

- Born: 8 April 1928
- Died: 23 January 2007 (aged 78)
- Other name: Walter y Chleree
- Occupations: Teacher; museum technician
- Organizations: Yn Çheshaght Ghailckagh; Culture Vannin
- Awards: Reih Bleeaney Vanannan (2001)

Walter Clarke RBV (8 April 1928 – 23 January 2007), or Walter y Chleree, was a Manx language speaker, activist, and teacher who was one of the last people to learn Manx from the few remaining native speakers on the Isle of Man. His work recording them with the Irish Folklore Commission helped to ensure that a spoken record of the Manx language survived.

== Early life ==
Clarke was raised in Bark Lane in Ramsey. He spent his early years in the company of his grandfather, a retired sea captain in Sulby. It was from his grandfather he learned his first words of the Manx language: "Grandfather had lots of Manx, so it came to me quite naturally". As a young man away from the Isle of Man on National Service, he came to the realisation that the language he learned from his grandfather was dying without anyone noticing.

== Manx language ==
On his return to the Island, he endeavoured to learn Manx. Firstly he started by visiting the elderly Manx speakers around the Island, who in turn introduced him to the small community of Manx language enthusiasts. They travelled around the Manx countryside on bicycles, visiting the native Manx speakers and learning the language. During this period, he found neither the Manx people nor the government was interested in learning and preserving the native language of Island.

According to Walter Clarke of the Manx Museum, a member of the society, there is very little enthusiasm for the language in Man to-day. “People think they can pick up Manx in six easy lessons,” he said. “when they find they can’t they lose interest.” Evening classes in the main towns were abandoned recently, and so was the society’s Manx journal Coraa Ghailckagh. An effort to get Manx taught in schools also failed.

== Irish Folklore Commission recordings ==
In the summer of 1947 Irish Taoiseach Éamon de Valera visited the Isle of Man. The Taoiseach was a fluent Irish speaker himself and was greatly interested in Gaelic and Celtic cultures. In Ireland, de Valera had been instrumental in setting up the Irish Folklore Commission in 1935 which recorded not only living and dying Irish dialects, but also Irish folklore and customs. As part of his trip to the Isle of Man, de Valera had a conversation with Ned Maddrell, the youngest of the last remaining native speakers, with Maddrell speaking Manx and de Valera in Irish.

During his trip, the Taoiseach heard that the Manx language was close to dying out, but that the Manx Museum did not have the facilities or funds to record and preserve the last speakers of the language. On de Valera's request, Kevin Danaher of the Irish Folklore Commission travelled to the Isle of Man with a crate of fragile acetate discs to record the last remaining native speakers on 22 April 1948. Walter Clarke along with Bill Radcliffe helped to transport the recording equipment and acted as a guide for Danaher, bringing him to the remote and isolated locations where the informants lived. They assisted Danaher and spent considerable time before every recording carefully balancing the equipment with a spirit level and connecting batteries and converters as many of the informants did not have electricity.

After the visit by the Irish Folklore Commission, Clarke and other members of Yn Çheshaght Ghailckagh continued to record the remaining natives speakers despite technical and financial restraints: "We just – we wanted to record the old people but we didn’t, we had neither the money nor the means of doing it". These recordings were often made at significant financial expense to themselves; John Gell for example loaned them £8 to purchase the necessary equipment.

Clarke in particular enjoyed speaking to John Kneen, also known as Yn Gaaue (the blacksmith) of which several recordings were made. Like Clarke, Kneen was from the north of the Island and was a very willing informant:

I think 95 or 96 when I first met him, he lived to be over 100, of course, he went blind, sadly, towards the end, but a tremendous character. He’d been a blacksmith, he’d been a farmer, he’d been a miller, you know, he really was a wonderful person.

== Later years ==
Clarke worked as a technician and curator at the Manx Museum. He created the Folk Life gallery and collected stories from informants from all over the Island, as well and material and artefacts for the Museum. Clarke later revived the teaching of Manx in Ramsey by setting up evening classes and talks.

Clarke also transcribed the recordings of the Irish Folklore Commission of the native Manx speakers into English and donated them to the Manx Museum:

It's slow work, but I enjoy doing it because it takes me back and I'm with the old people, sitting by the hearth again. But it also makes me sad, because their like is not about any more. There's something about the character that has been lost. They were remarkable people. They led a hard life, but they weren't bothered with stress. Time wasn't money like it is today. None of them had travelled very much, except to the fair in Douglas, but they were much more contented than people are today.

In recognition of his lifetime of work in preserving the culture and language of the Isle of Man, Clarke received the Reih Bleeaney Vanannan award in 2001.
