= John Gell (Manx language activist) =

Manx speaker, teacher, and author

- Juan y Geill
- Born: 1899; Liverpool, Lancashire
- Died: 23 November 1983 (aged 83–84); Port St Mary, Isle of Man
- Occupations: Teacher and author
- Organization: Yn Çheshaght Ghailckagh
- Known for: Author of Conversational Manx

John Gell (1899 – 1983), also known as Jack Gell or Juan y Geill, was a Manx speaker, teacher, and author who was involved with the revival of the Manx Language on the Isle of Man in the 20th century. His book Conversational Manx, A Series of Graded Lessons in Manx and English, with Phonetic Pronunciation has been used by learners of the Manx language since it was published in 1953.

== Early life ==
Gell was born in Liverpool to Manx-speaking parents who chose to raise their children through English. He spend his childhood summers on the Isle of Man staying with relatives, describing the Island as being "truly heaven on earth to me in my youth".

As a child Gell and his family lived in various towns around the North West of England such as West Kirby and Ellesmere Port. Despite winning a free place at the local grammar school, Gell left school at fifteen, and became an apprentice joiner like his father.

Gell was conscripted into the British Army towards the end of the First World War. In September 1918 he was wounded at the Somme and was sent Sheffield to recuperate.

== The Manx language ==
In 1938 Gell was inspired to learn Manx when he met a Scottish woman at the Empire Exhibition in Glasgow who was shocked that he did not speak the language:

Then she said "Shame on thee, you are a Manxman with no Gaelic. Go on and learn it while there are people speaking it." I was truly ashamed hearing so much Scots Gaelic being spoken around me and I promised that sweet young woman to do my best to learn our own Gaelic.

Throughout the Interwar Period, Gell lived and worked in Yorkshire as a woodwork teacher, but made frequent visits to the Isle of Man learning directly from the last remaining native speakers of Manx and by using an old Manx Bible that belonged to his grandfather.

== Return to the Isle of Man ==
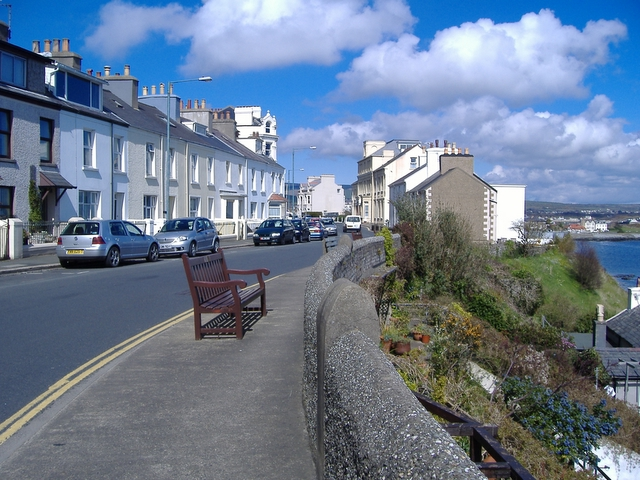
The seaside village of Port St. Mary where Gell lived with his family.

In 1944 Gell moved to Port St. Mary on the Isle of Man with his family and started working in the newly established Castle Rushen High School. He worked as a woodwork teacher during the day and taught Manx language classes at night.

The following year after a visit by Irish Taoiseach Éamon de Valera to the Isle of Man in 1947, the Irish Folklore Commission was tasked with recording the remaining native speakers as the Manx Museum did not have the facilities or funds to do so. This inspired Gell and other Manx speakers such as Walter Clarke and Bill Radcliffe to make their own recordings themselves despite technical and financial restraints: "We just – we wanted to record the old people but we didn’t, we had neither the money nor the means of doing it". These recordings were often made at significant financial expense to themselves; with Gell himself loaning them £8 to purchase the necessary equipment.

In 1953 Gell published Conversational Manx, A Series of Graded Lessons in Manx and English, with Phonetic Pronunciation to aid adult learners of Manx that were attending his classes which was serialised in Manx newspaper Mona's Herald, and published the next year. They were described as "one of the best teaching books we have". In the 1960s the book formed the basis of a weekly 'listen and learn' radio programme presented by Doug Fargher.

== Later years ==
Despite Gell's work in creating new learner material and teaching Manx classes, he still found negative attitudes towards the language to be a major difficulty. After the sudden death of his wife in 1955, he retreated somewhat from Manx language movement:

But at that time there was not much attention given to the Gaelic and we made little progress. Seldom did anyone learn enough to speak it, and the old Manx speakers were dying one after the other, and I was losing heart, then after my own wife died, I did not pay much attention to the Manx either.

The 1970s saw a resurgence in interest in Manx and which inspired Gell to become active in the Manx speaking community and "do something myself for the Manx before it will be too late". In 1977 he published his bilingual memoirs Cooinaghtyn my Aegid (Reminiscences of my Youth) and Cooinaghtyn Elley (Further Reminiscences) and later provided an audio recording to help learners.
