= Arthur William Moore =

Manx antiquarian, historian, linguist and folklorist (1853–1909)

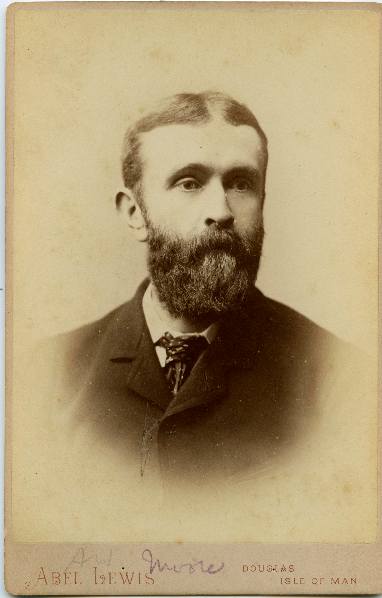
- Arthur William Moore
- Born: 6 February 1853; Braddan, Isle of Man
- Died: 12 November 1909 (aged 56); Douglas, Isle of Man
- Burial place: Kirk Braddan
- Occupations: Antiquarian, historian, linguist, folklorist, and politician.
- Organisation(s): Isle of Man Natural History and Antiquarian Society; Yn Çheshaght Ghailckagh

Arthur William Moore, CVO, SHK, JP, MA (6 February 1853 – 12 November 1909) was a Manx antiquarian, historian, linguist, folklorist, and former Speaker of the House of Keys in the Isle of Man. He published under the sobriquet A. W. Moore.

== Life ==
Arthur William Moore was born in Cronkborne, Braddan. He was the son of William Fine Moore MHK and a descendant of Illiam Dhone. He was educated at Rugby School and at Trinity College, Cambridge. Thereafter he assisted his father in the management of the sailcloth manufactory, and on his father's death in the eighties, he succeeded to the business. He was also a great sportsman, being a blue whilst at Cambridge, an active rower, and a founding member of Cronkbourne Cricket Club. He also bore the entire cost of the forming and furnishing of this club and of laying the ground.

On 22 February 1887 he married Louisa Elizabeth Wynn Hughes-Games (1866-1937). They had four children: Helena (b. 1888), Margery (b. 1889), William (b. 1890, d. 1891 aged 3 months) and Arthur (b. 1895).

Moore died on 12 November 1909 and was buried at Kirk Braddan. After his death his widow married George Frederick Clucas (1870-1937).

== Political career ==
In 1881 there was a general election of the House of Keys and Arthur Moore stood for election. He was successful along with Richard Penketh and William Dalrymple in being elected as MHKs for Middle. He was subsequently returned in this position for every further General Election he stood at. Arthur Moore was a man of common sense who researched thoroughly his duties and parliamentary responsibility, and thus when Sir John Goldie-Taubman died in 1898 he was elected Speaker of the House of Keys narrowly beating John Allen Mylrea to the post. Politically speaking he was a moderate liberal. In his years as Speaker he welcomed King Edward VII and Queen Alexandra to the island during their visit in August 1902, an occasion on which he was appointed a Commander of the Royal Victorian Order (CVO) by King Edward. In 1905 he was appointed Deputy Receiver General and took a particular interest in constitutional reform and was thus one of the deputation who petitioned the Home Secretary Herbert Gladstone to urge the reform.

== Manx literature ==
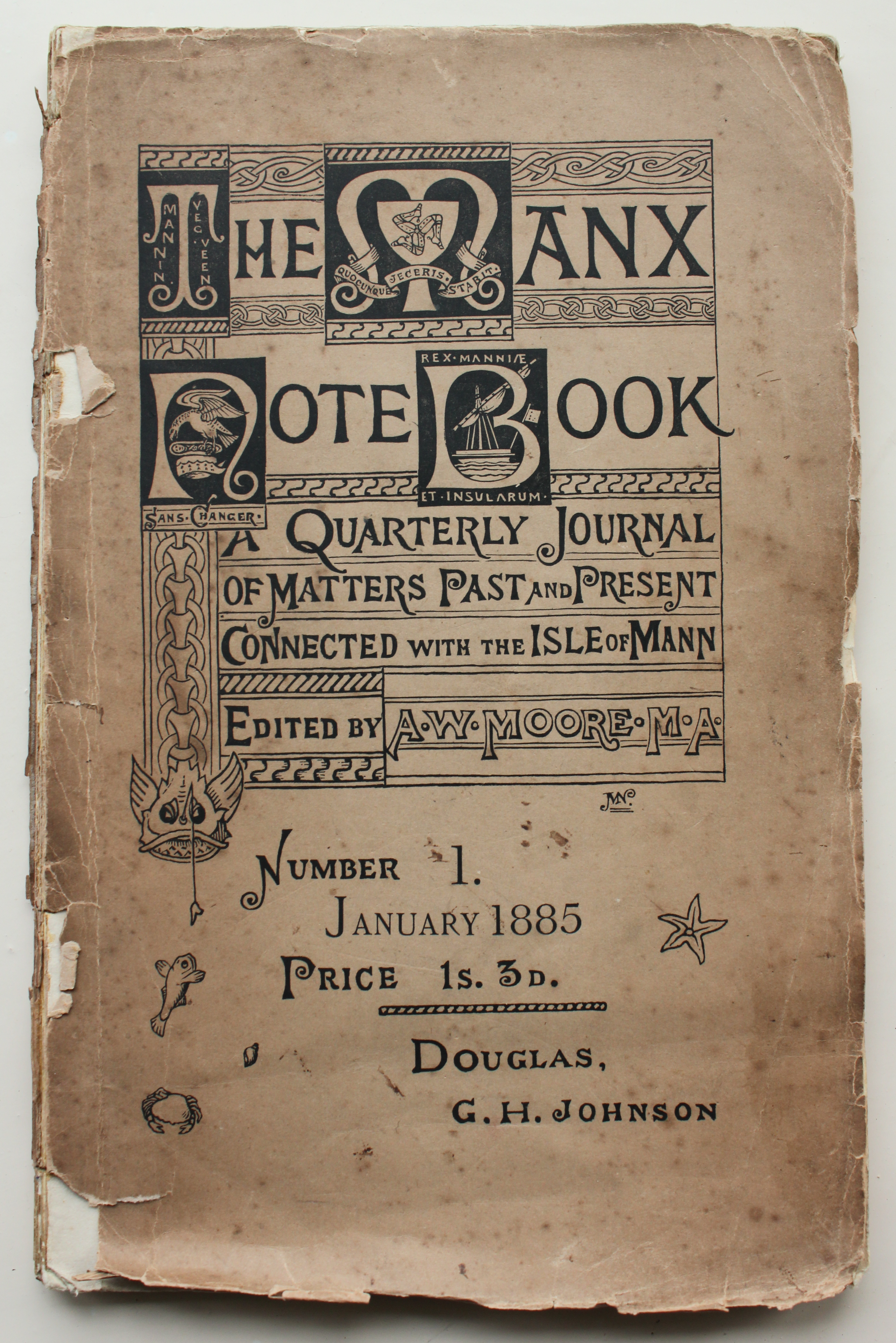
The first edition of 'The Manx Notebook'

Having learned as a young man the Manx language, he devoted much study to the then-neglected language, despised by British authorities. He collected a vast vocabulary and traced its linguistic history. In 1899 he founded the Manx Language Society and became its first president, thus becoming the spiritual forefather of the neo-Manx language movement. He in 1893 edited for the Manx Society for the Publication of National Documents The Book of Common Prayer in Manx Gaelic, the earliest and longest manuscript in the language.

Arthur Moore was also particularly interested in literature dealing with the Isle of Man and sought to conserve not only the language but the music, lore, and tradition of the island. He founded and edited the Manx Notebook as well as writing a History of the Isle of Man and many other historical works on the Island. As such he was made a Fellow of the Royal Historical Society and the Meteorological Society. He was also greatly involved in the revival of the Manx language and was the official translator of Acts of Tynwald into Manx. Shortly after a Royal visit to the Island, Mr Moore was made a Commander of the Royal Victorian Order. He was also a Director of both the Isle of Man Bank and the Isle of Man Steam Packet. He was appointed a justice of the peace in 1877 and was for many years the Captain of the Parish of Onchan before resigning in 1895. Mr Moore was also a Mason and became the Junior Grand Deacon of the province of the Isle of Man.

Moore managed to settle the kerfuffle between P. M. C. Kermode and Dr. Guðbrandur Vigfússon of Oxford over the reading of runic inscriptions on Manx crosses, the correspondence of which appeared in Moore's own periodical "The Manx Note Book".

At his death, he left unfinished a dictionary of the Anglo-Manx dialect, which was completed in 1924 by Manx scholars Sophia Morrison and Edmund Goodwin, as A Vocabulary of the Anglo-Manx Dialect.

=== List of works ===
This is an incomplete list of works:

- The Surnames and Place Names of the Isle of Man (1890)
- Folk-Lore of the Isle of Man (1891)
- Manx Carols (1891)
- The Diocese of Sodor and Man (1893)
- "Further Notes on Manx Folk-Lore" in The Antiquary (1895)
- Manx Ballads and Music (1896)
- History of the Isle of Man (1900)
- The Story of the Isle of Man (1901)
- Manx Worthies (1901)
- Bishop Hildesley's Letters (1904)
- Douglas 100 Years Ago (1904)
- Extracts from the Records of the Isle of Man (1905).
- A Vocabulary of the Anglo-Manx Dialect (1924, posthumous)
