= Kevin Danaher =

Irish folklorist

- Used with permission from the National Folklore Collection. Taken 1946, UCD School of Irish, Celtic Studies, Irish Folklore and Linguistics.
- Born: Caoimhín Ó Danachair; 30 January 1913; Athea (Ath an tSleibhe), County Limerick, Ireland
- Died: 14 March 2002 (aged 89)
- Occupations: Writer and Irish folklorist
- Years active: 1935–1986

Kevin Danaher (Irish, Caoimhín Ó Danachair) (30 January 1913 – 14 March 2002) was an Irish folklorist with a special interest in ethnography and military history.

Danaher authored ten books about Irish traditional customs and beliefs, the best known of which include The Year in Ireland, In Ireland Long Ago, and Folktales from the Irish Countryside. As a scholar, Danaher published more than 200 articles in academic journals.

== Early life ==
Kevin Danaher was born in Athea (Ath an tSleibhe), County Limerick, Ireland, on 30 January 1913. Danaher's father, William, was the local schoolmaster. His early education was at Athea National School and Mungret College, County Limerick. In 1934, Danaher became a part-time collector for the Irish Folklore Commission.

Danaher attended University College Dublin, graduating with a BA in 1937. He was awarded a fellowship by the Alexander von Humboldt Foundation to carry out postgraduate studies in Germany, and studied comparative folklore and ethnology for two years at the Universities of Berlin and Leipzig.

When World War II broke out, Danaher returned to Ireland and joined the Irish Army. He rose to the rank of captain, and served as an instructor for the Artillery Corps, training soldiers in Kildare in Ireland.

After his discharge from the army, Danaher resumed his studies, being awarded his MA from the National University of Ireland in 1946.

In early 1940, he once again worked for the Irish Folklore Commission, first as a field worker and then as the commission's official ethnographer, collecting, cataloguing and illustrating large amounts of traditional tales and folklore, primarily from his home county of Limerick. Some of his sources were family members, such as his father, Liam. His research in the area of seasonal customs and folk practices would later appear in his many articles and books.

== Academic career ==
In 1952–53, Danaher was a visiting lecturer at the University of Uppsala, Sweden.

After further education abroad, in 1971 Danaher was appointed a statutory lecturer in Irish Folklore at University College Dublin (UCD). In 1974, he was awarded the degree of Doctor of Literature by the National University of Ireland in recognition of his original contribution to scholarship.

From 1973 through his retirement in 1983, Danaher was lecturer for the Department of Irish Folklore at UCD. As an expert in military history, he was a member of the Irish Military History Society, serving on their council in a variety of capacities. He was the group's president from 1971 through 1980, and editor of their journal, The Irish Sword, from 1960 through 1970. He was also a member of the Royal Society of Antiquaries of Ireland and contributed to the society's journal. From 1988 until his death in 2002, he served as co-patron of the Folklore of Ireland Society, and continued to publish articles in their journal, Bealoideas as he had done regularly since 1935.

When Danaher retired from his position at University College Dublin, his students organised a celebratory volume in his honour: Sinsear: The Folklore Journal 4 (1982–83). A number of his students, colleagues and prominent scholars made up the international roster of writers paying tribute to Danaher, his work, and his influence. At the same time, his academic colleagues organised the publication of a festschrift, Gold Under the Furze

In 1985, Danaher suffered a stroke, the effects of which put an end to his professional career. He died on 14 March 2002, after a long illness.

== Works ==
Note on nomenclature: Danaher published his "popular" writings, on folklore and military history, as "Kevin Danaher". His "academic" works were signed with his Irish name, Caoimhín Ó Danachair.

- The Danish Force in Ireland 1690–91 (With Dr. J. G. Simms) (1962) Dublin, Stationery Office for the Irish Manuscripts Commission. – A scholarly edition of original documents and letters relating to the Danish mercenaries in the Williamite war.
- In Ireland Long Ago (1962) Dublin, Mercier Press. ISBN 0-85342-781-X. – Danaher's 1st collection of popular articles
- Irish Customs and Beliefs (Originally published as Gentle Places and Simple Things) (1964) Cork, Mercier Press. ISBN 1-85635-442-3 Danaher's 2nd collection of popular articles
- Irish Country People (1966) Cork, Mercier Press. – Danaher's 3rd collection of popular articles
- Folktales from the Irish Countryside Dublin, Mercier Press. (1967) ISBN 0-85342-849-2. – Stories collected by Danaher in West Co. Limerick.
- The Pleasant Land of Ireland (1970) Cork, Mercier Press. – The scripts of the television series "The Hearth and Stool and All".
- The Year in Ireland (1972) Dublin, Mercier Press. ISBN 1-85635-093-2. – Customs and ceremonies relating to feast-days and different seasons of the year.
- Foirgneamh na nDaoine: Ireland's Vernacular Architecture (1975) Cork, Mercier Press. – A fully illustrated account of traditional house designs and construction. This was also published in a new edition with many new illustrations as
- Ireland's Traditional Houses Dublin, Bord Fáilte. ISBN 0-901146-12-9
- A Bibliography of Irish Ethnology and Folk Tradition (as Caoimhín Ó Danachair) (1978) Cork, Mercier Press.
- "That's How it Was" (1984) Cork, Mercier Press. ISBN 0-85342-714-3 – Danaher's 4th collection of popular articles
- The Children's Book of Irish Folktales (1984) Dublin, Mercier Press. ISBN 0-85342-718-6. – Selected stories from Folktales from the Irish Countryside, simplified and illustrated.
- The Hearth and Stool and All!: Irish Rural Households (1985) Cork, Mercier Press. ISBN 0-85342-734-8 – The guidebook to the Bunratty Folk Park, revised and expanded.

== Other media ==
From 1938 to 1970, Danaher shot and collected photographs from around Ireland. In the Spring of 1968, Danaher presented a five-part TV programme about Irish traditions, "The Hearth and Stool and All".

In 1948, Danaher recorded the last native Manx speakers on the Isle of Man, on behalf of the Irish Folklore Commission, redeeming a promise made by Éamon de Valera when, as Taoiseach, he visited the island in 1947. The transcriptions, translations and the digitally remastered recordings of this collection were published as Skeealyn Vannin/Stories of Man, by Eiraght Ashoonagh Vhannin/Manx National Heritage.
