= Manx people =

Ethnic group from the Isle of Man

Manx
Ny Manninee

Total population
- 95,788

Regions with significant populations
- Isle of Man 40,555 (2021 census) (48.2% of the population)

Diaspora
- United States: 6,955
- Canada: 6,125

Languages
- English (see Manx English) · Manx

Religion
- Predominantly Christianity mostly Protestant (Anglican and Methodist, Baptist), also Roman Catholic, Mormon, Christian Scientist, Atheist

Related ethnic groups
- Scots, Irish, Gaels, English, Norse-Gaels, Welsh, Cornish, Bretons, Faroese, Orcadians

The Manx (/mæŋks/ MANKS; Manx: ny Manninee) are an ethnic group originating on the Isle of Man, in the Irish Sea in Northern Europe. The Manx are governed through the Tynwald (Ard-whaiyl Tinvaal), the legislature of the island, which was introduced by Viking settlers over a thousand years ago.

The native mythology and folklores of the Manx belong to the overall Celtic Mythology group, with Manannán mac Lir, the Mooinjer veggey, Buggane, Lhiannan-Shee, Ben-Varrey and the Moddey Dhoo being prominent mythological figures on the island. Their language, Manx Gaelic (Gaelg, Gailck) is derived from Middle Irish, which was introduced by settlers who colonised the island from Gaelic Ireland. However, Manx Gaelic later developed in isolation and is classified as a separate Goidelic language of the Insular Celtic languages.

== Isle of Man demographics ==
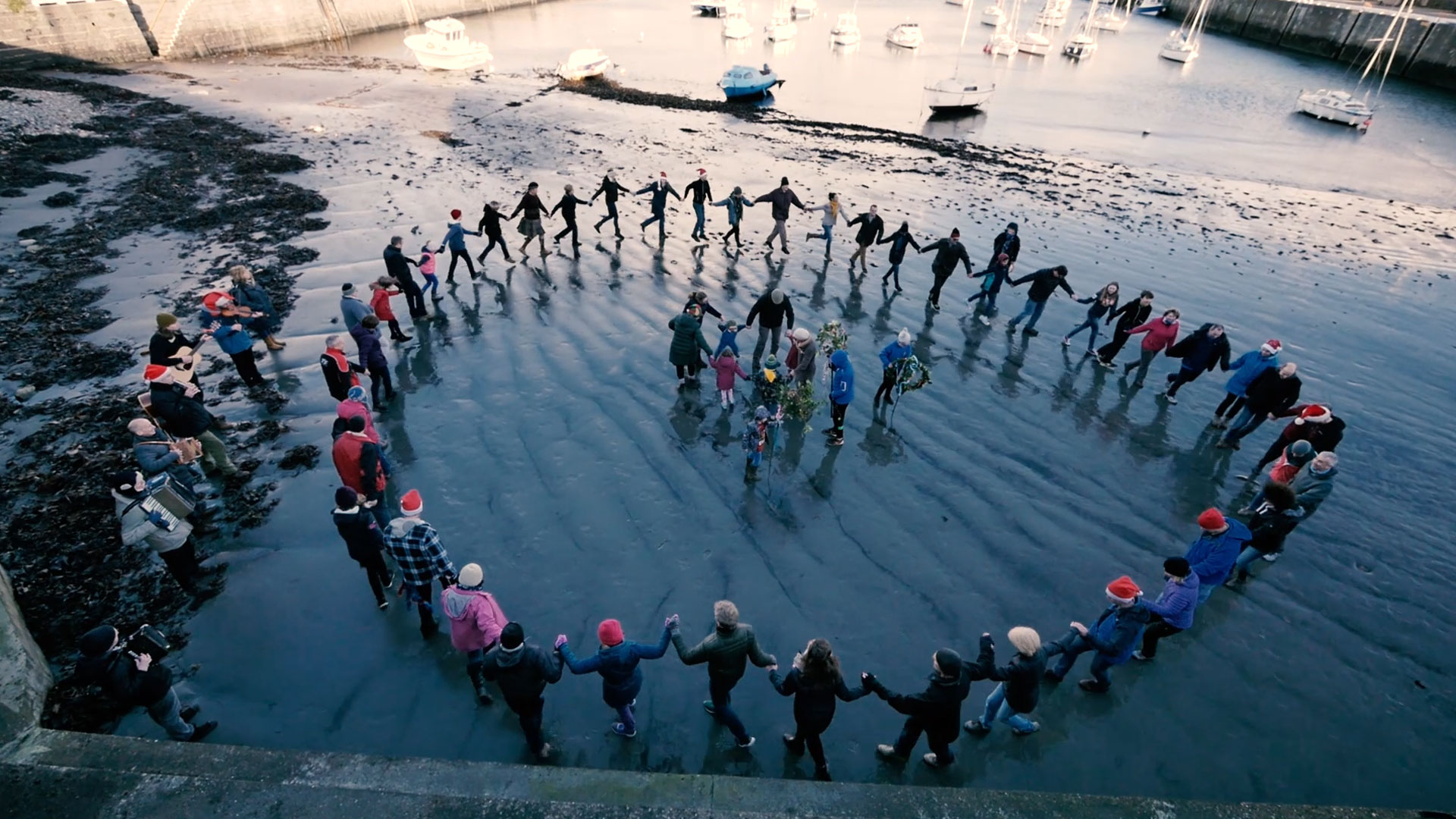
Hunting the wren at Port St Mary, a traditional Saint Stephen's Day ritual.

According to the 2011 interim census, the Isle of Man is home to 84,655 people, of whom 26,218 reside in the island's capital Douglas (Doolish). The largest proportion of the population was born on the island, but major settlement by English people (Sostnagh/ Sostynagh) and others has significantly altered the demographics. According to the 2011 census, 47.6% were born in the Isle of Man, and 37.2% were born in England, with smaller numbers born elsewhere: 3.4% in Scotland, 2.1% in Northern Ireland, 2.1% in the Republic of Ireland, 1.2% in Wales and 0.3% born in the Channel Islands, with 6.1% of the population having been born elsewhere in the world.

Manx people living in the UK were commonly grouped by the 2001 census under "White British". The extremely high ratio of "come-overs" to "natives" has brought with it changes in terms of culture, identity and speech. Manx people have also made a significant contribution elsewhere through migration. The Manx have a long tradition of moving to Liverpool for work. Many people connected to Liverpool have Manx ancestry: among them are Paul McCartney of The Beatles, American actress Olivia Wilde, former Vice President of the United States Dan Quayle and singer Chris Cornell. Many Manx people emigrated to the United States and there are notable populations in Cuyahoga County and Lake County, Ohio.

== Languages ==
Bilingual street sign, Ramsey town centre

Manx people have traditionally had three vernaculars:

- Manx, a Gaelic language (çhengaghyn Gaelgagh).
- English language
  - Anglo-Manx, the distinctive indigenous English dialect of the Manx, now much diluted.
  - British English, the usual form of English used in the Isle of Man, especially for formal purposes.

The English language is used in Tynwald (Tinvaal); the use of Manx there is restricted to a few formulaic phrases. However, some Manx is used to a limited extent in official publications, street signs etc. Education in the Manx language is offered in schools.

The Bunscoill Ghaelgagh is a Manx-language primary school in St John's, Isle of Man. As of 2011 it is the only school in the world where children are taught their lessons solely in Manx and which allows children to learn the language fluently. The school is considered successful and is part of the Manx language revival. After UNESCO listed the language as extinct in 2009, pupils wrote letters asking "If our language is extinct then what language are we writing in?", and the classification was later changed to "critically endangered". Lewis Carroll's Alice in Wonderland (Ealish ayns Çheer ny Yindyssyn) is read in translation after 30 copies were presented to the Bunscoill Ghaelgagh by the Manx Gaelic Society when the book was officially launched.

== History and politics ==
The Isle of Man is one of the six Celtic nations, and has been under Norse, Scottish, English control and self-governing for much of the past thousand years.

The earliest traces of people in the Isle of Man date to around 8000 BC, during the Mesolithic Period, also known as the Middle Stone Age. Small, nomadic family groups lived in campsites, hunting wild game, fishing the rivers and coastal waters and gathering plant foods.

The Neolithic period was marked by important economic and social changes. By 4000 BC, people once reliant upon the uncultivated natural resources of the land and sea had adopted cereal growing and stock rearing, using imported species of grain and animals. Large-scale clearance of natural woodland provided fields for crops and animal fodder.

During the Iron Age, Celtic influence began to arrive on the island. Based on inscriptions, the inhabitants appear to have used a Brythonic language; however, at some point, possibly c. 700 AD, it is assumed that Irish invasion or immigration formed the basis of a new culture, and the Manx came to speak Gaelic. This language has developed in isolation since, though it remains closely related to Irish, and Scottish Gaelic.

At the end of the 8th century, Viking settlers began to arrive and establish settlements, eventually coming to dominate the island.

The Norse Kingdom of Mann and the Isles was created by Godred Crovan in 1079. The Norse had a major effect on the island, leaving behind Norse placenames, and influencing its distinctive political system, Tynwald (from Old Norse, Þingvóllr), which is one of the oldest parliamentary democracies in the world.

In 1266, under the Treaty of Perth, Norway's King Magnus VI ceded the isles to Scotland. For more than a century the Isle of Man, during the Anglo-Scottish wars, passed between Scotland and England. During this troubled period, the Island was captured by the Scottish army of Robert the Bruce in 1313. Later in the 14th century, when England once more seized the Island, the Lordship – indeed kingship – was given to the Montacute family, Earls of Salisbury.

In 1405, the Lordship was granted to Sir John Stanley, whose descendants (later the Earls of Derby) ruled the Isle of Man for over 300 years. The lordship passed through a female line to the Dukes of Atholl in 1736 and was eventually purchased by the British Crown in 1765.

Since 1866, when the Isle of Man obtained a measure of home rule, the Manx people have developed into a modern nation with an economy based decreasingly on agriculture and fishing and increasingly first on tourism and then on financial and other services.

The 20th century saw a revival of interest in Manx music and dance, and in the Manx language, though the last native (first language) speaker of Manx Ned Maddrell died in the 1970s. In the middle of the 20th century, the Taoiseach Éamon de Valera visited and was so distressed at the lack of support for Manx that he immediately had two recording vans sent over to record the language before it disappeared completely.

The economic changes gave a short-lived impetus to Manx nationalism in the 1970s and 1980s, spawning Mec Vannin, a nationalist group, as well as the now-defunct Manx National Party and Fo Halloo ("Underground"), which mounted a direct-action campaign of spray-painting and house-burning. Nationalist politics has since declined and a number of its former proponents are now in mainstream politics.

The 1990s and early 21st century have seen a greater recognition of indigenous Manx culture, such as the first Manx-medium primary school, though Manx culture still remains on the margins of popular culture for the majority of Manx residents.

== Chronicles of Mann and English possession ==
The Chronicles of the Kings of Mann and the Isles or Manx Chronicle is a manuscript relating the early history of the Isle of Man. The Chronicles are a yearly account of significant events in Manx history from 1016. Written in Latin, it documents the island's role as the centre of the Norse kingdom of Mann and the Isles. The Chronicles also document the influence of its kings, religious leaders and the role of Rushen Abbey.

== See also ==
- List of Manx people
- List of residents of the Isle of Man
- Manx surnames, surnames originating on the Isle of Man
- Manx Americans
