= Yn Çheshaght Ghailckagh =

Manx language organisation

- Formation: 1899; 127 years ago
- Headquarters: Thie ny Gaelgey, St Judes, Andreas, Isle of Man, IM7 2EW
- Fields: Manx language promotion, publishing
- Website: ycg.im
- Formerly called: The Manx Gaelic Society

Yn Çheshaght Ghailckagh, also known as the Manx Language Society and formerly known as Manx Gaelic Society, is an organization founded in 1899 in the Isle of Man to promote the Manx language. The group's motto is Gyn çhengey, gyn çheer (Without language, without country).

== History ==
Following the decline of Manx as a community language on the Isle of Man during much of the 19th century, there was renewed interest in the language most notably among educated men; this mirrors the founding of Conradh na Gaeilge in Ireland as part of the Gaelic Revival.

From 1897–1899 several meetings were held in Peel to discuss the Manx language. In the wake of these meetings, language classes began, as well as lectures given on Manx music and customs. The group's first president was A.W. Moore, later Speaker of the House of Keys. Several other prominent members of the Manx language revival, such as J. J. Kneen, Dr John Clague, and Edmund Goodwin, were all founding members of Yn Çheshaght Ghailckagh in 1899 in Peel. Yn Çheshaght Ghailckagh was not concerned only with the preservation and promotion of the Manx language, but rather with all things related to Manx culture:

Though called the Manx Language Society, it should, I think, by no means confine its energies to the promotion of an interest in the language, but extend them to the study of Manx history, the collection of Manx music, ballads, carols, folklore, proverbs, place-names, including the old field names which are rapidly dying out in a word, to the preservation of everything that IS distinctively Manx, and, above all, to the cultivation of a national spirit.

In 1948, after a visit to the Isle of Man by Taoiseach Éamon de Valera, the Irish Folklore Commission was tasked with recording the last remaining native speakers on fragile acetate discs. Members of Yn Çheshaght Ghailckagh, Walter Clarke and Bill Radcliffe, helped Kevin Danaher in the tedious and delicate work of setting up the recording equipment.

After the visit by the Irish Folklore Commission, members of Yn Çheshaght Ghailckagh continued to record the remaining native speakers despite technical and financial restraints: "We just – we wanted to record the old people but we didn't, we had neither the money nor the means of doing it". Eventually they were able to make these recordings, but often at significant financial expense to themselves; John Gell for example loaned them £8 to purchase the necessary equipment.

== Recent years ==
After a long period of relative inactivity, in the 1970s Doug Fargher helped to reinvigorate Yn Çheshaght Ghailckagh by organising Oieghyn Gaelgagh ('Manx Language Nights') and publishing new learner material.

Yn Çheshaght Ghailckagh has been involved in organising Cooish, an annual inter-Gaelic festival of language and culture on the Isle of Man every autumn since the 1990s. The festival aims to promote Gaelic and Manx identity and is "an opportunity to come together, enjoy the culture and celebrate one of the really unique ways of belonging to the Isle of Man". The festival includes musical performances, workshops, lectures, and language classes for children and adults.

A stamp celebrating the centenary of the Society was issued in the Isle of Man in 1999.

In more recent years, Yn Çheshaght Ghailckagh has been heavily involved with the publication of Manx language and culture works, and the society works closely with Culture Vannin.

== Selection of published works ==
- Conversational Manx by John Gell
- First Lessons in Manx by Edmund Goodwin
- Manx is Fun: A New Course in Spoken Manx for the Beginner by Paul Rogers
- Dunveryssyn yn Tooder-Folley by Brian Stowell
- Jeih Skeealyn Scaanjoon by Koizumi Yakumo (translated into Manx by R. W. K. Teare)
- Ecstasy as Skeealyn Elley by Ré Ó Laighléis (translated into Manx by R. W. K. Teare)
- Droghad Ny Seihill by Christopher Lewin
- Cooinaghtyn My Aegid by John Gell
- Skeealyn Lewis Crellin by Lewis Crellin

== See also ==
- An Comunn Gàidhealach
- Conradh na Gaeilge
- Caarjyn ny Gaelgey
