= The White Boys (mummers) =

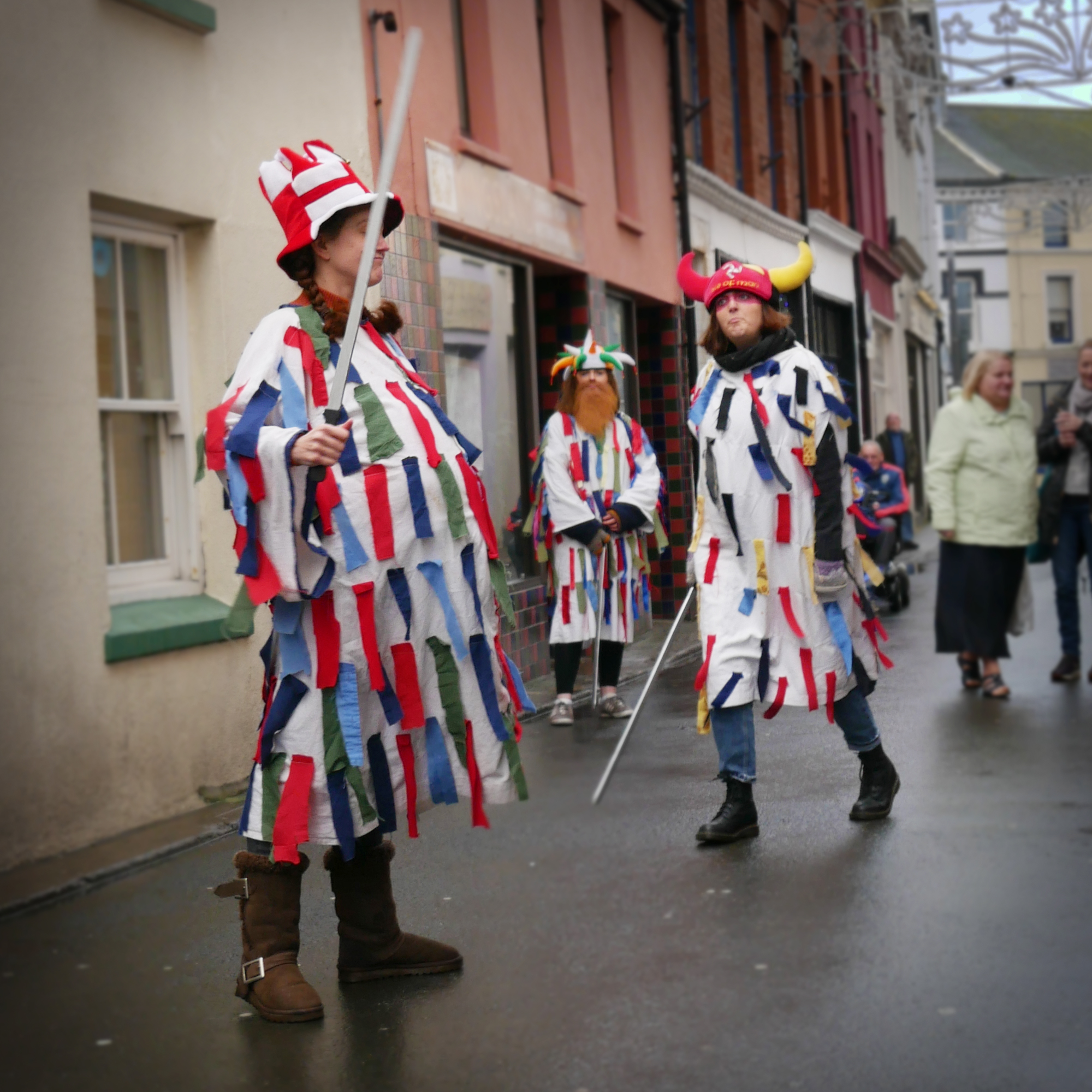
A performance of the White Boys in Peel, 2019

The White Boys (Manx: Ny Guillyn Baney) is the traditional mummers' play of the Isle of Man.

The play and its actors are named because of the unusual white clothing they wear. The play is traditionally performed in public places close to Christmas, and it concerns knights fighting and killing one another before being resurrected by a doctor, after which there is a song and a dance. Historical scripts date back as far as 1832, and it is still performed on Manx streets each year.

== History ==
=== Nineteenth Century ===
The earliest known record of the White Boys dates to 1832, when a full version of the play by 'the Douglas White Boys' was printed in the Manx Sun newspaper. The first eyewitness account of a performance is from 1838, when it was said that:

For several nights before Christmas, it is customary for boys, dressed in white [...] to perambulate the streets [...] and solicit contribution at the various dwellings

At this time, the White Boys were considered to be, alongside Hunt the Wren and the Fiddlers, 'amongst the most popular amusements of Christmas,' with their strength remaining 'untouched by the enervating hands of time and change.'

Boys or young men visited houses in the local community to perform the play in the late afternoon or early evening in the lead-up to Christmas. They would knock on doors and call out 'Who wants to see the White Boys act?' before the actors would be invited into homes. The play would normally be performed in either the sitting room or in the kitchen, where it was conventionally enjoyed by the whole household.

The performances were described as being 'a rude comical drama, half verse, and half prose run-mad,' often delivered in a 'hurried manner and the burlesque intonations of the speakers,' making it 'of all oddities the most odd.' However, it remained entirely compelling with eye-witnesses noting that 'the excitement attached to the "White Boys” can scarcely be imagined,' and 'the greatest actor in all the world could not have charmed us half so much.'

After the conclusion of the performance, the actors would receive their unnysup (the 'deserving'); a donation in thanks for the entertainment. This was reported as being generally quite generous. Money was expected but many households also offered food and drink:

[The White Boys] are not averse to the pennies; but if solids are not to be had, they readily put up with liquids, in shape of gin, or even Jough, alias Manx beer.

The White Boys were known all over the Isle of Man, including the following: Andreas, Arbory, Ballabeg, Ballaragh, Ballaugh, Castletown, Douglas, Glen Auldyn, Glenchass, Jurby, Laxey, Lezayre, The Lhen, Maughold, Kirk Michael, Peel, Port Erin, Ramsey and Sulby. Many individual houses and inns are also known to have been visited.

=== 1890s to 1950s ===
By the end of the 19th century, the practice was reported as 'formerly common, [but] now almost moribund.' By this stage the doctor's role was taken by the smallest person of the group, most commonly a young boy. This was remarkable when the group incorporated drinking into their activities, and the Doctor was therefore sometimes left at a friend's house as pubs were visited.

The White Boys were adversely affected by the outbreak of the First World War. For instance, the previously popular and successful White Boys of Ramsey ceased after December 1913 and were not able to restart due to the introduction of a £5 Street Traders licence. The White Boys in Castletown continued until at least 1931, when young boys of about 10 years old were performed the play.

From the 1910s Mona Douglas and Phillip Leighton Stowell were working to collect the dance believed to have been performed at the play's conclusion. It was through this that the play was revived and presented by boys from Castletown at a public entertainment in January 1939.

The play received some institutional support over this period, such as from the church, through the Ballabeg Sunday School in the 1900s and the Young Men's Club of a church in Peel in the early 20th century. Schools such as Ballamoda in 1934 and Ballasalla School in 1951 also began to stage the play, and Arbory School played a particularly important role in the play's living survival by producing it within the school for decades, from as early as 1943 through to the 1970s and beyond.

Although not well documented, the White Boys also continued to be performed in some form in Port Erin until at least 1950.

=== 1970s to present ===
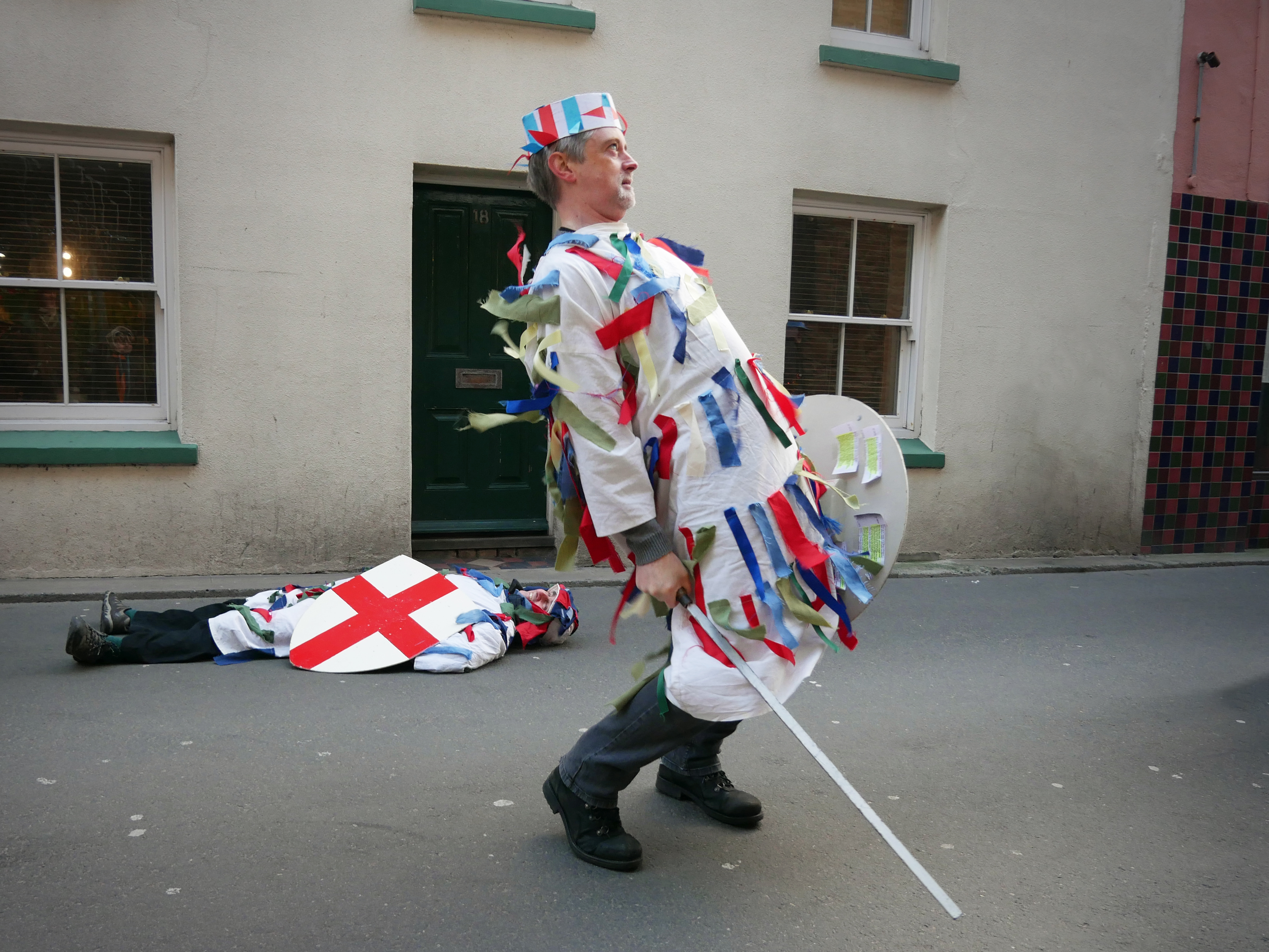
St. Denis dies, in a performance of the Rinkaghyn Vannin script, Peel 2019

In 1975 the play was independently revived for public performance by Ross Trench-Jellicoe, Colin Jerry, Bob Carswell, David Fisher, Ian Coulson, Stewart Bennett, George Broderick, Phil Gorry and Mark Shimmin. As members of the Manx dance group, Bock Yuan Fannee, they had originally planned to perform the dance only and only later came to prepare the play also. Although a complete rewrite of the play was prepared by Stewart Bennett to address contemporary politics, the version eventually performed was an amalgamation of the 1832 and 1845 versions, with other slight additions. On the last Saturday before Christmas 1975 they performed the play concluding with the sword dance at fourteen locations all over the Isle of Man.

The script developed for these performances was published in 1983 in the book of Manx dances, Rinkaghyn Vannin. Here it appeared with music and full instructions for the White Boys Dance.

The play continued to be performed on the streets of the Isle of Man for 31 years by a changing set of actors connected to Bock Yuan Fannee. True to the tradition, the play was adapted to contemporary interests and concerns, most notably with a complete rewrite in the 1990s which replaced the characters of the play with Sir MHK, Sir Banker, Sir Cherished Number Salesman, Sir Expert and Estate Agent. The final recorded performance by members of Bock Yuan Fannee was in Peel in 2007.

In 2010 a book on the White Boys compiled and edited by Stephen Miller was published by Chiollagh Books; "Who wants to see the White Boys act?" The Mumming Play in the Isle of Man: A Compendium of Sources. One review called it 'a comprehensive collection' with 'erudite and perceptive' accompanying notes.

Although the White Boys Dance continued to be regularly performed, particularly by Perree Bane and Skeddan Jiarg, the play was performed only intermittently in the 2010s, such as in an abridged form at the Bree Weekend in 2016.

In December 2019 the play returned to the Island's streets in the two weekends before Christmas. Performed by two independent groups, the play was put on in Port St. Mary, Port Erin, Colby, Ramsey, Castletown (twice), Peel (twice) and Douglas (four times). The group performing on 21 December presented a new version of the traditional play which playfully reassigned the heroic knight as the recognisably Manx St. Maughold, and the antagonist as St. George. Two groups of performers have performed the play around the Island in the run-in to Christmas each year since then.

== Plot and variations ==
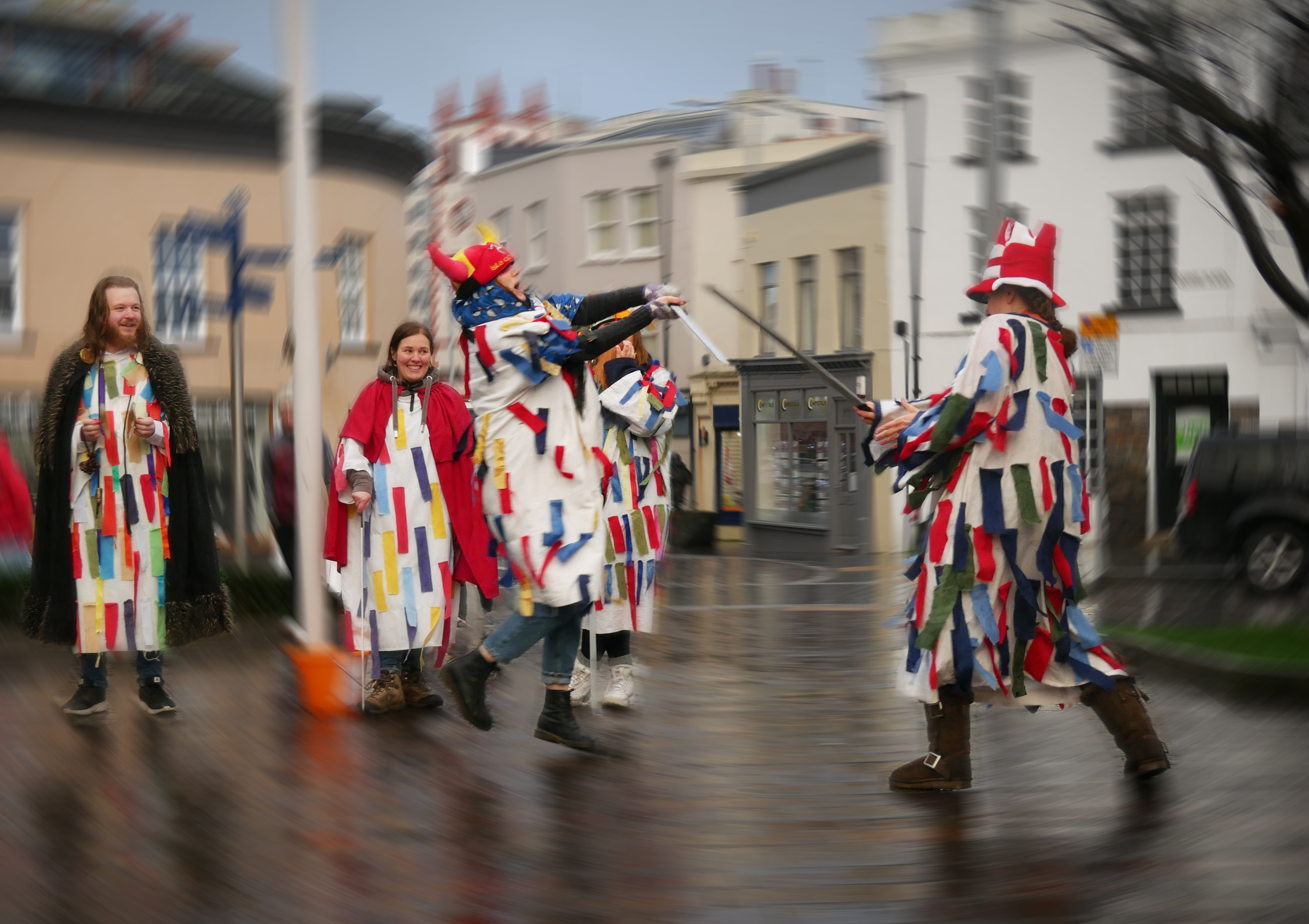
The White Boys, Ramsey, 2019

There are six historical White Boys scripts. Although all vary from one another, the dominant core of the narrative is as follows:

A short introduction of the drama is followed by the entrance of the patriarch character, who introduces the hero (normally St. George). An antagonist then enters and proceeds to kill the hero in a fight. The patriarch calls for help and an aid enters to fight the antagonist on his behalf. After the antagonist is killed, the patriarch calls for a doctor, who enters to revive the two dead men. When the combatants rise and begin to fight again, the patriarch steps in to stop them. Then there is a song, an argument about who is to pay the doctor, and a dance.

As was noted in 1869, the traditional approach to the play is to vary or adapt it in performance:

The plot everywhere seems to be pretty nearly the same; scarcely any two sets of performers render it alike, constantly mixing up extraneous matter, often of a local nature, and frequently allusive to the passing events of the day, making the confusion of character in all the versions very great.

This is evident in the varying characters involved in the historical scripts:

Characters in the historical White Boys scripts
Date collected	Introducer	Patriarch	Hero	Antagonist	Aid	Doctor	Money collector	Other
1832			St. George	St. Denis	St. Patrick	Doctor		
1845	(Sambo)	King of Egypt	St. George	Prince Valentine	Sambo	Doctor		
1890s?	(All)	King of Denmark	King George	Prince Valentine	Mac Man	Doctor	Sambo	Girl
c.1907-10*	(Doctor)	King George	St. George	Prince Valentine		Doctor		
1950	(Turk)	King of Egypt	St. George	Turk	Page	Doctor		
1983	Samson	King of Egypt	St. George	Turk		Doctor	Belgium Bum	
* Partial text

In addition to these characters, references to the play beyond the available scripts show that Beelzebub, Devil Doubt, King and Turkish Champion were also present in other versions of the play.

The 1890s script is notable for the appearance of a girl interrupting the first fight to offer wine to the combatants. As well as this speaking role, this script also unusually has a cast list, which pairs each of the male parts with a female role; Queen, two Princesses and two Maids.

The modern variations of the script also reflect the historic variance of characters:

Characters in the modern White Boys scripts
Date	Introducer	Patriarch	Hero	Antagonist	Aid	Doctor	Money collector	Other
1983	[Prologue]		St. George	St. Denis	St. Patrick	Doctor		Big Head Little Devil Doubt
1990	[Prologue]		Sir MHK	Sir Banker	Sir Cherished Number Salesman Estate Agent	Doctor		
1999	[Prologue]		Sir MHK	Sir Banker	Sir Expert Estate Agent	Doctor		
2019	Devil Doubt	St. Patrick	St. Maughold	St. George	Mac Man	Doctor		

The 1983 script printed in Rinkaghyn Vannin noted that it was created from the 1832 script 'with variants from other recorded versions.' The text shows that it was constructed using the scripts of 1832, 1845, 1890s, 1950 and 1983, and well as introducing material not known in any historical Manx scripts. Most remarkable in this new material is the 20 lines and fight of Big Head and Little Devil Doubt at the close of the play, only six lines of which can be found in the historical Manx scripts.

As well as replacing the characters with contemporary figures, the 1990s versions of the White Boys were remarkable for re-writing the script entirely as biting commentary on contemporary Manx politics.

In 2019 a new edit of the historical scripts was created for the performances given on 21 December of that year. Although faithful to the historical sources, this new edit playfully reassigned the heroic knight as St. Maughold (a recognisably Manx character) and the antagonist as St. George.

The relative prominence of the roles within the play also varies over time, with the key comic character being seen as the Doctor in 1845, Sambo in 1909, and Devil Doubt in 1928. Today, whether comic or otherwise, the key role is seen to be the Doctor.

Today, a key line in the play is considered to be the contents of the Doctor's bottle, with which he cures those injured in the fighting. However, there is little consensus across the historical sources over this particular line:

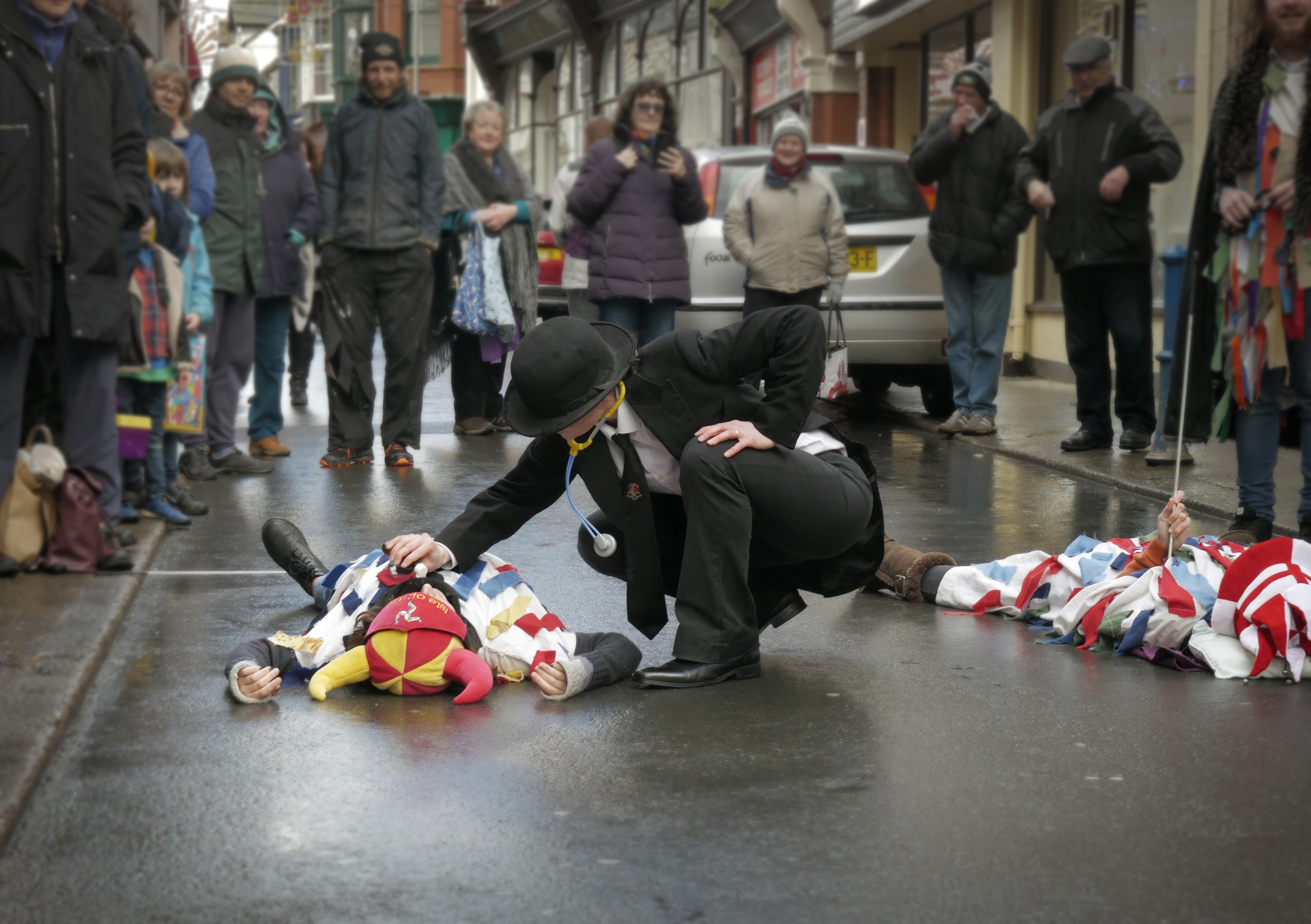
The Doctor revives the saints, Peel, 2019

Scripts
1832	[no bottle is mentioned]
1845	Rixum-raxum, prixum-praxum, with I-cock-o'-lory...
1890s?	Rixum-roxum, trixum-traxum, Hi cock-o-lori!
c.1907-10	Highcockalonius
1950	Ricksdom, dicksom, hi-cock-a-lorum, Jigle-om-jig, Rasbo, Rasbo
1983	Hicksome, Sticksome, High Cock-a-Lorum, Ign-Viti, Dogshu-iti and little drops of Curiosity
Other sources
1950	Riskum Raskum Hi-Cockalorum Jigiturn a Jig
1971	Rixum Raxum, Prixum Praxum, Hiccokolorum
1971	highcockalonius
2009	Rixum, Praxum, Hixum Taxum, High dick-a-lorum, Cockaluma-a-Jig

Also of note are the lines:

- Oh! Oh! We are all brothers, / Why should we be all through others?
- O Doctor! Doctor! Is there a doctor to be found, / Can cure St. George of his deep and deadly wound?

The former is a distinctive Manx dialect phrase, directly translated from the Manx 'fud y cheilley,' meaning 'confused.' The latter rhyme might suggest that the play would have been performed in a strong Manx accent in order to make the rhyme work. The prominence of the Manx accent is also historically relevant to the name, as it was noted that it was perhaps more commonly spoken of by some as 'the Quite Boys.'

== Costume ==
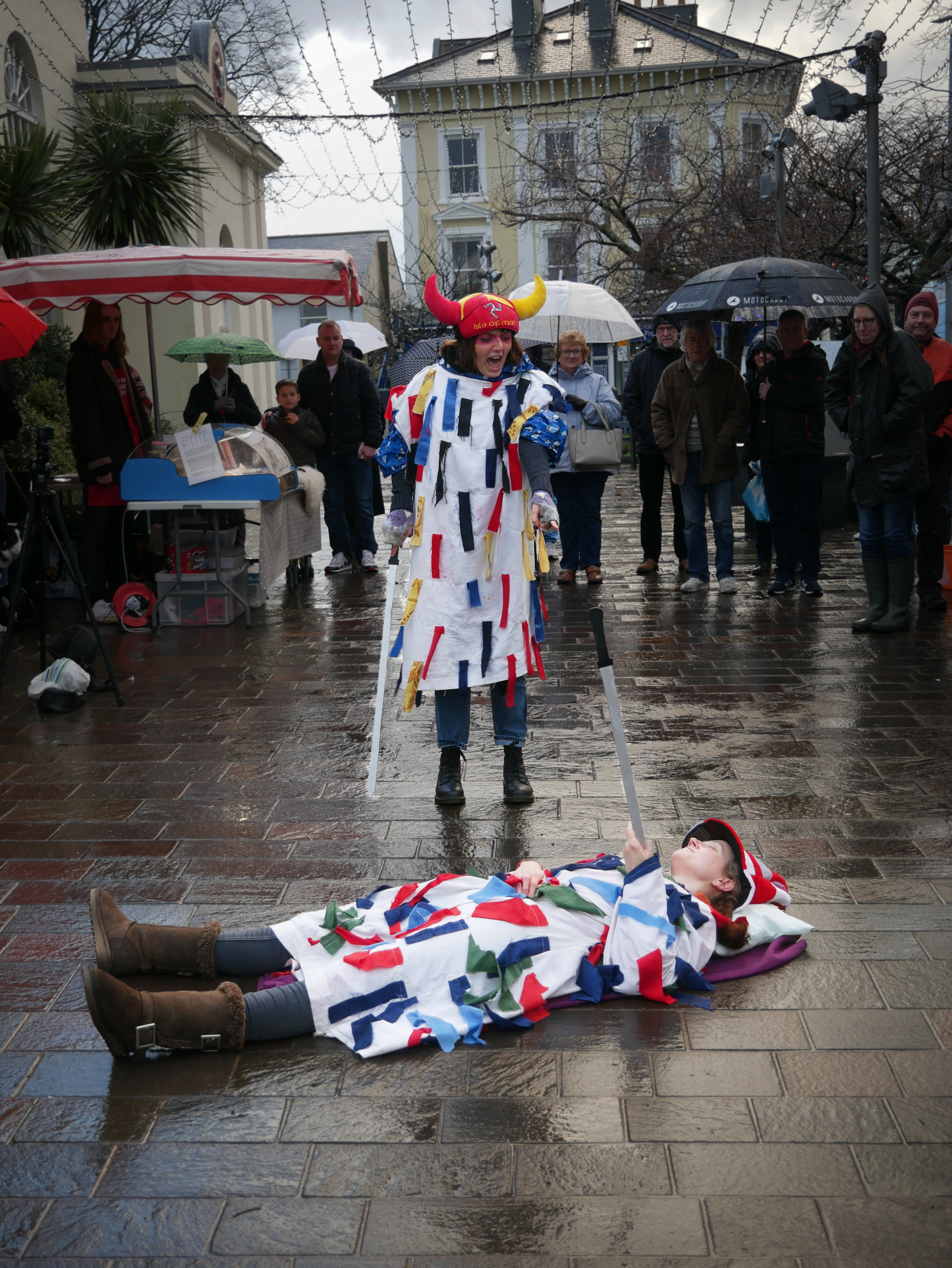
A performance of the White Boys, Ramsey, 2019

An essential part of the White Boys has always been the costume as it is from their unusual white clothes that they derive their name.

As a folk practice, there has never been a determined uniform for the different sets of practitioners across the Isle of Man and descriptions vary across time and location. References to the costume include the following:

- '...boys dressed in white' [Douglas, 1838]
- 'the dramatis personae [...] as their designation imparts, are attired in white dresses, paper, beads, and tinsel. They wear high caps or turbans of white pasteboard similarly decked out, with a sprig of evergreen or "Christmas" stuck in them, and each carrying a drawn sword in his hand. The Doctor is in full black, with face and cap of the same' [1845]
- 'lads dress up in white, with high pyrmadical paper caps, appearing fantastic enough, and carrying with them wooden swords' [1852]
- 'arrayed in their fearful and wonderful costumes' [1897]
- 'decked out very much after the haphazard fashion of the "Wren Boys," only with more dabs of white about them. White cardboard hats, strangely reminiscent of a mere common or garden bandbox, crowded with scraps of ribbon and holly leaves, crowned their energetic heads. Paste-board swords, if nothing more stalwart was forthcoming, clanked (of course, you had to pretend a lot about the clank) against the agile white-trousered legs, and spotless shirts, adorned with odds and ends of Christmas decoration variety, completed the outfit. Only one of the players departed from the general scheme, and he wore unrelieved black, raven-like and dolorous, even to face and hands. He was the "docther"' [Port Erin, 1909]
- 'They wore hats of a traditional form. "The kind I remember was pointed $\bigtriangleup$ and all covered over with strips of coloured paper (as varied in colour as possible)... The strips hanging downward like a fringe, slightly over the brim, and there rows upon rows of these strips... often gummed on to the foundation of stiff paper" [1941]
- 'dressed in white calico suits, three-cornered hats, and wooden swords. Their hats and clothes were decorated with gaily coloured paper ribbons.' [Douglas, 1950]
- 'They wore white blouses gathered in at the waist – a long sleeve and a frilled write like a bishop has. The blouses had red stripes on them – red material sewn on, and epaulettes on the shoulders.' [Ramsey, 1959]
- 'the usual tall hats, white suits, and according to his account sometimes striped trousers were worn, black or blue and white – the material rather like you get in a butcher's apron he said. His own hat was a big three-cornered thing – like an Admiral's hat – he made one for me out of newspaper, and a black coat and he had his face and his hands blackened.' [Ramsey, 1971]
- 'The boys are all in white with coloured ribbons dangling down - the sash over the right shoulder and a helmet of cardboard - gold, silver, or crimson. All had the long streamers dangling down, all the team wore that. [...] The Doctor is all dressed in black, hat, a frock coat or short coat, trousers and shoes. all black.' [Castletown (revival), 1971]
- 'I was in a long hat, like an Admiral's hat, all done with paper, and the other men had round hats, and they were done with this crinkley paper. That was the dress, like, and they had white trousers, white coats, and black and white trousers. Now, I had an old frock tailcoat and black trousers and I was the Doctor. [...] Yes, they had belts [...] beautiful tin belts about 3 ^{1}/_{2}" or 4" wide, and he had big stars planted on them. They only cost us a shilling each, I think. [...] Tall hats they had, oh, I suppose about 18 inches. [...] Yes, usually [decorated] by the different coloured paper. [...] Yellow and blues and greens and purples. You cut them in strips and then you snip them with scissors all the way down. Then they were doubled back and stick that on to the hat all the way round. Mix all the colours up you know and it was very very effective.' [Ramsey, 1971]
- 'the costume was fairly makeshift, and just a white suit, with much less finery than here described' [1984]

It is also of note that an account of a performance from 1909 stated that Sambo, in distinction from the Doctor, did not vary from the other White Boys in his costume and in not having any form of makeup.

The dominant costume for most of the actors today is a white smock covered in strips of coloured fabric, with hats and often shields indicating their character. In contrast, the Doctor dresses in dark Victorian gentlemen's attire, with tail-coat and a bowler or top hat.

== Song ==
There are a number of songs associated with the White Boys, the best known of which is what is today known as the White Boys Carol (Carval ny Guillyn Baney):

Then here’s success to all brave boys
Of stout and gallant heart,
In battlefield or banquet board
Prepared to play a part.
We handle well both knife and fork
Likewise the sword and spear,
And we wish you a merry Christmas
And a good new year,
And we wish you a good new year!

With hostile bands confronted,
To fight we are not slack,
On roast beef and plum pudding
We can make a stout attack.
We handle well both knife and fork
Likewise the sword and spear,
And we wish you a merry Christmas
And a good new year,
And we wish you a good new year!

This is the only song to feature in any of the White Boy scripts. It appears before the argument over the Doctor's payment in the 1832 script only.

Another 'Carol of the White Boys' was published in 1898 by W. H. Gill in his Manx National Music. Beginning with the lines, 'I wish you a Merry Christmas and a Happy New Year, / A pocket full of money and a cellar full of beer,' the song is better known elsewhere in association with the quaaltagh tradition of the Manx New Year.

Other songs are known to have regularly featured as a part of the performances, commonly after the conclusion of the drama or whilst leaving the venue. In at least the early twentieth century these songs were frequently popular songs of the day, performed as solo songs by the actors.

== Dance ==
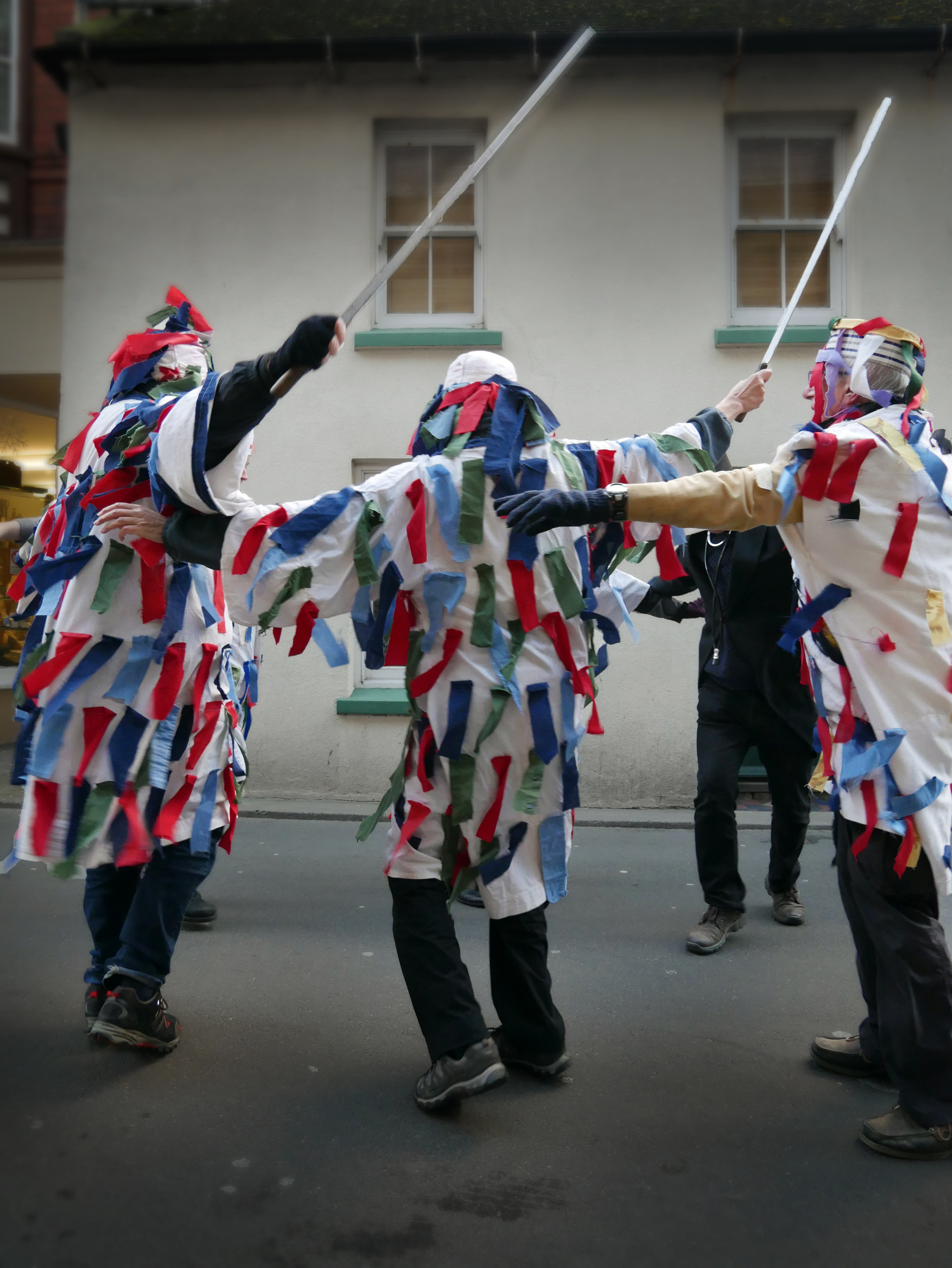
The White Boys Dance, performed in Peel, 2019

The White Boys Dance (Rinkey ny Ghuilleyn Baney) is performed at the end of all contemporary performances of the play. References to a dance appear in very few historical accounts of the White Boys, but the earliest is from 1840:

"Good morning to you, Mr and Mrs McKenzie," sounded at two o'clock in the morning; "and all the family that is small, good morning to you, and luck to you," and then a dance, a mock fight, and strains that would have murdered all the cows on the island, and this repeated with little variation down an entire street.

Although Mona Douglas began to be collect something of the dance in Maughold prior to 1916, the dance was ultimately collected by Phillip Leighton Stowell between c.1925 and 1934. Its first recorded public performance was in the Royal Albert Hall.

At this point of the dance's revival, there was no lock of the swords at the conclusion, but only 'a woven cross-seat':

At the end there are six men in a ring – they pile their swords one-by-one on top of each other, the dancers going round slowly in a jog trot and then the Doctor runs in and sits on the swords and is raised up on them

Although the collected version of the dance has the Doctor sit on the swords, there is evidence that he stood on the swords in some performances.

A variant of this in the 2000s introduced the Laair Vane, another Manx Christmas tradition, who fooled about the dance before being carried out on the swords. However, the modern version of the dance is almost universally performed with a lock of swords held aloft at the conclusion of the dance, a feature introduced in the 1980s through contact with English folk dance societies. However, there is some evidence that such a finish to the dance was used in a performance under Leighton Stowell as far back as 1939.

Daunse Noo George (St. George's Dance) is another dance also associated with the White Boys. First alluded to by Mona Douglas in 1941, it was finally collected by Leighton Stowell in 1948, at which point it received its first performance in Port Erin. The song and tune associated with Daunse Noo George has an unclear origin, as Leighton Stowell offers conflicting accounts of its being both collected and composed. Although it was historically performed by the St. George character at the conclusion of the play, it is today performed only as a display dance separate from the play itself.
