= Ballure =

Ballure may refer to:

- Ballure, Isle of Man, a hamlet on the Isle of Man
  - Ballure Halt, an intermediate stopping place on the Manx Electric Railway, Isle of Man
- Ballure, County Antrim, a townland in County Antrim, Northern Ireland
