= Port e Vullen =

Hamlet in the Isle of Man

Coordinates: 54°18′31″N 4°21′08″W

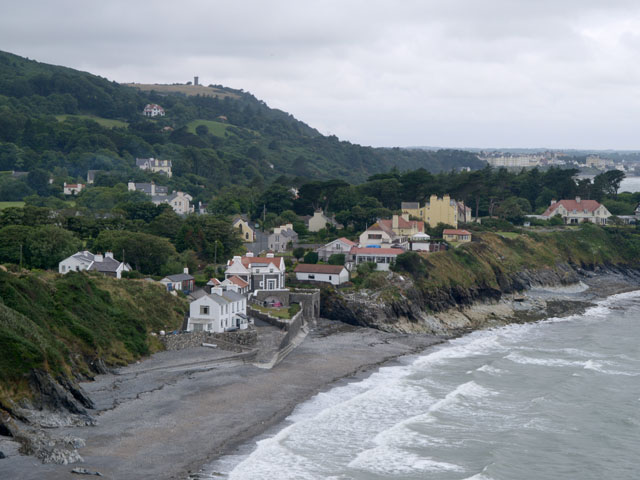

- Location within the Isle of Man
- Parish: Maughold
- Sheading: Garff
- Crown dependency: Isle of Man
- Postcode district: IM7
- Police: Isle of Man
- Fire: Isle of Man
- Ambulance: Isle of Man

Port e Vullen is a small coastal hamlet along Ramsey Bay in the parish of Maughold, Isle of Man. It is situated to the east of Ballure, and west of Maughold.

== Toponymy ==
Port e Vullen (also stylised as Port-e-Vullen and historically Port-a-Vullen or Vullin) comes from Port y Wyllin, meaning "harbour or port of the mill".

== Geography ==
At Gob ny Rona, the rock is divided between Barrule formation on the western side and Maughold formation on the eastern side. The Maughold formation extends from Port e Vullen eastward through the Maughold Brooghs to Gob ny Skey. There are also "particularly dense areas" of eelgrass beds off the coast at Port e Vullen.

== History ==
Circa the 1830s, a Wesleyan Methodist chapel and Sunday school opened in Port e Vullen.

The inlet at Port e Vullen was once the location of the telegraph cable between the Isle of Man and St Bees, Cumbria before it was moved in 1875 to the inlet at Port Cornaa.

On a low promontory between Port e Vullen and Port Lewaigue is the sight of Fort Loyal.
