= Bellevue railway station =

Bellevue railway station can mean:

- Bellevue Station (France), railroad station in Meudon, France
- Bellevue station (MBTA), in West Roxbury, Massachusetts, United States
- Bellevue railway station, Perth, Western Australia
- Berlin Bellevue station, a station on the Berlin S-Bahn railway network
- Bellevue Transit Center, a bus hub and light rail station in Bellevue, Washington, United States

See also

- Belle Vue railway station, Manchester, England
- Belle Vue Halt, Isle of Man
