= Belle Vue Halt =

Rail stop on Isle of Man

Bellevue (For Port-E-Vullen) Reayrt Aalin
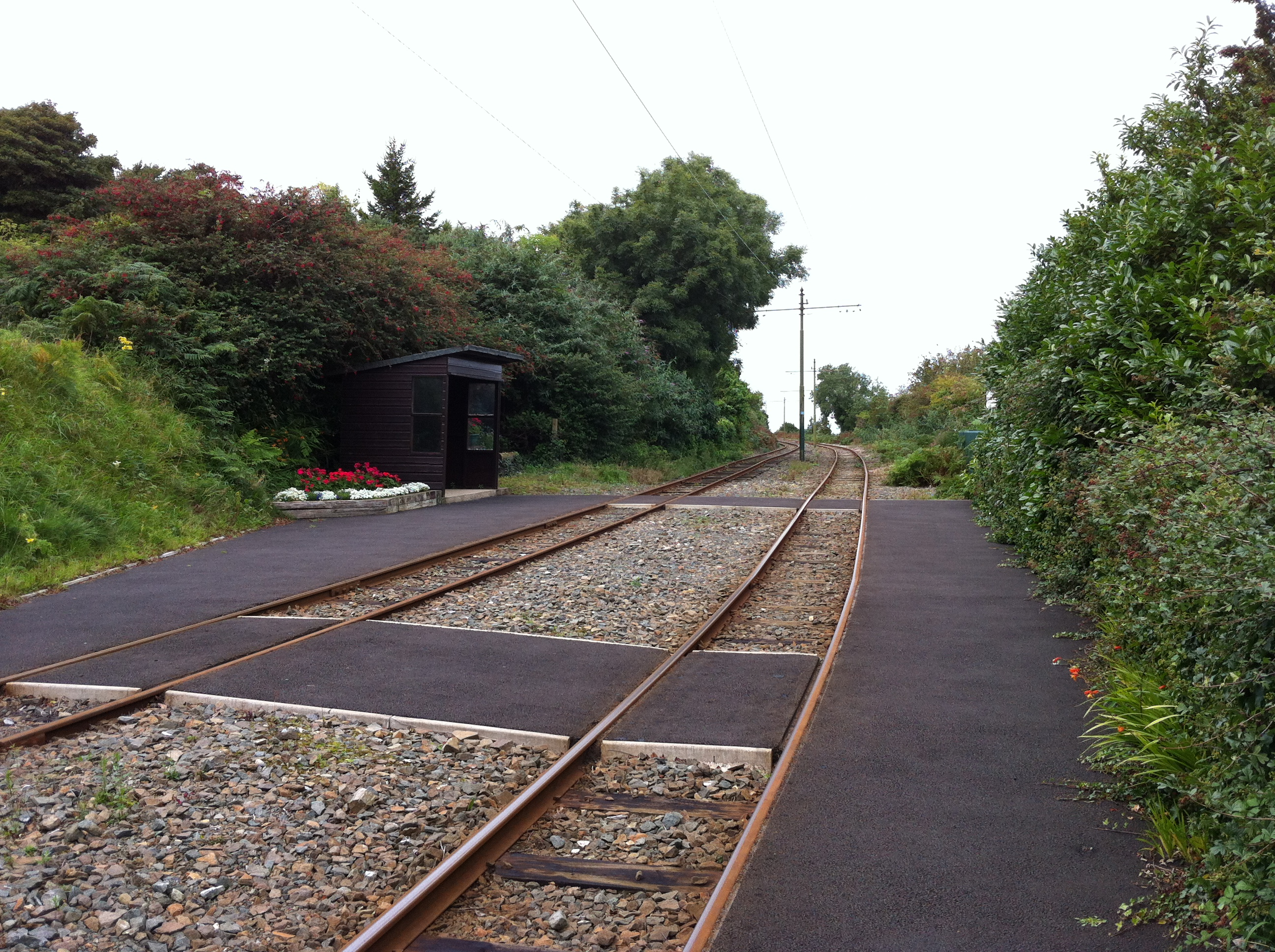

General information
- Location: Maughold, Isle Of Man
- Coordinates: 54°18′35″N 4°21′41″W
- Pole Nos.: 846-847
- System: Manx Electric Railway
- Owner: Isle Of Man Railways
- Platforms: Ground Level
- Tracks: Two Running Lines

Construction
- Structure type: Waiting Shelter
- Parking: None

History
- Opened: 1899
- Former names: Manx Electric Railway Co.
Location

Belle Vue Halt (For Port-E-Vullen), also known as Bellevue (Manx: Stadd Reayrt Aalin), is an intermediate stopping place on the northern section of the Manx Electric Railway on the Isle of Man.

== Location ==
It is situated between Lewaigue Station and Ramsey, the line's northern terminus. The poles bearing the overhead lines on the M.E.R. are numbered from Douglas and Belle Vue can be found at pole 846. The halt is located on the A15 road to Maughold Village and is actually closer to Port Lewaigue than to Port-E-Vullen.

== Shelter ==
Until 2001, there was a corrugated iron lineside shelter at the stop. Following some local controversy over its demolition, it was eventually replaced by a wooden structure originally located at Port Jack, north of Douglas.

== Route ==
Preceding station	Manx Electric Railway	Following station
Lewaigue towards Derby Castle	Douglas–Ramsey	Ballure towards Ramsey Station

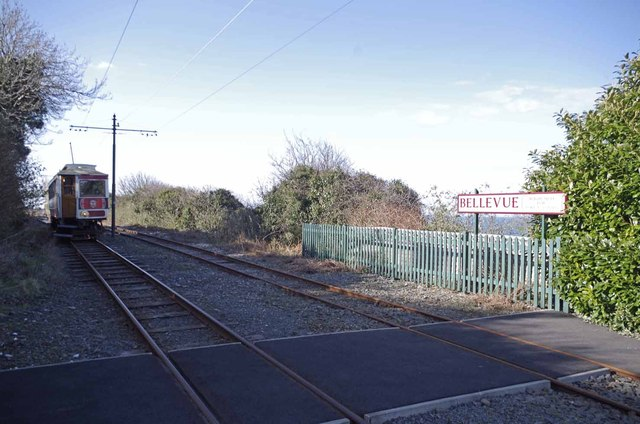
The alternate spelling of the station name, here used on a station nameboard

== Also ==
Manx Electric Railway Stations

== Sources ==
- Manx Electric Railway Stopping Places (2002) Manx Electric Railway Society
- Island Island Images: Manx Electric Railway Pages (2003) Jon Wornham
- Official Official Tourist Department Page (2009) Isle Of Man Heritage Railways
