= Mummers' play =

Type of folk play

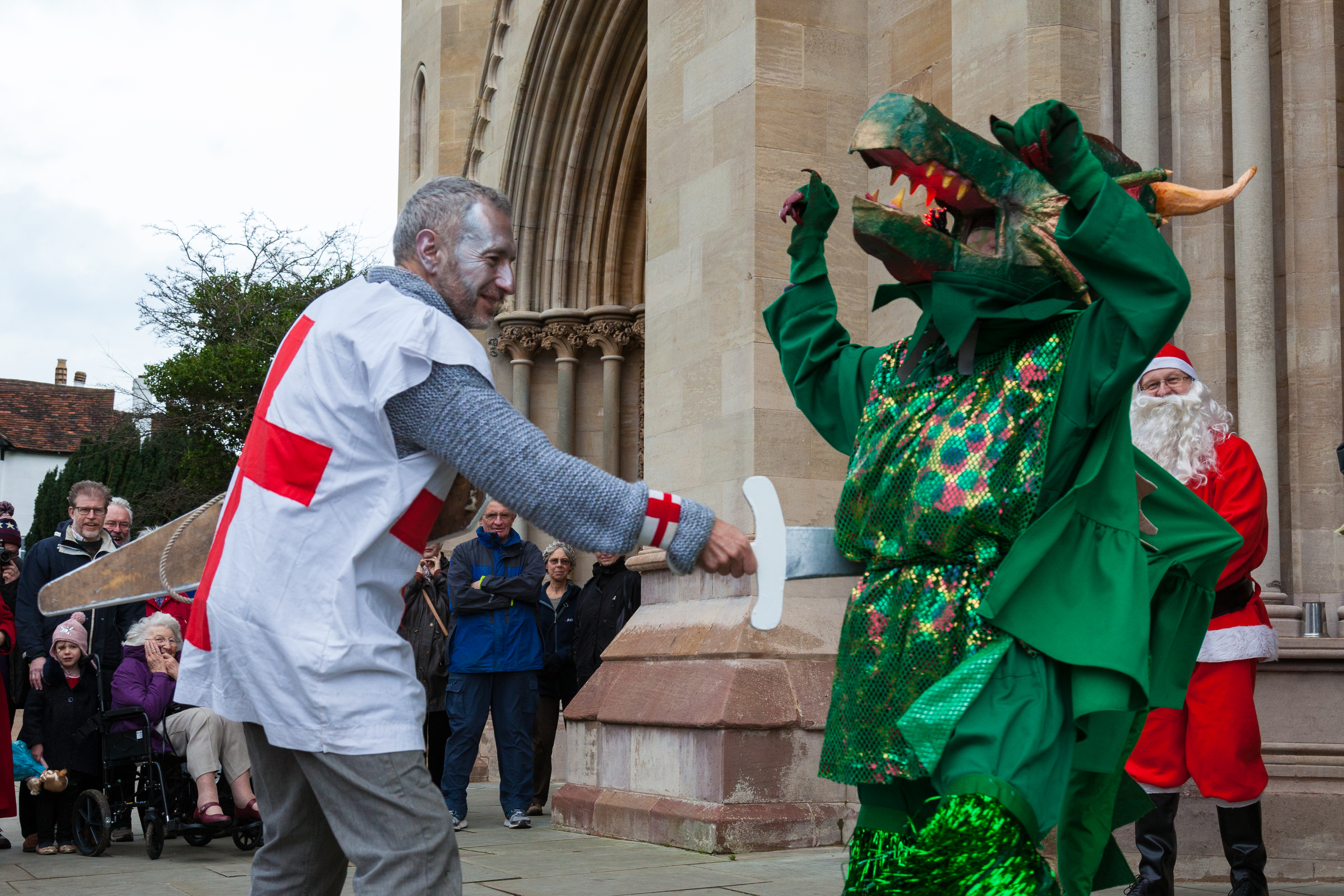
St. George slays the dragon in a 2015 Boxing Day production by the St Albans Mummers.

Mummers' plays are folk plays performed by troupes of amateur actors, traditionally all male, known as mummers or guisers (also by local names such as rhymers, pace-eggers, soulers, tipteerers, wrenboys, and galoshins). The term refers especially to a play in which a number of characters are called on stage, two of whom engage in a combat, the loser being revived by a doctor character. This play is sometimes found associated with a sword dance though both also exist in Britain independently.

Plays may be performed in the street or during visits to houses and pubs. They are generally performed seasonally, often at Christmas, Easter or on Plough Monday, more rarely on Halloween or All Souls' Day, and often with a collection of money. The practice may be compared with other customs such as those of Halloween, Bonfire Night, wassailing, pace egging and first-footing at new year.

The term mumming has been in use since the Middle Ages to refer to informal groups of costumed community members that visited from house to house on various holidays, but there appear not to have been folk plays associated with mumming from that era. The earliest evidence of mummers' plays as they are known today is from the mid- to late 18th century. Mummers' plays also should not be confused with the earlier mystery plays.

Mummers' plays spread from the British Isles to a number of former British colonies. Ireland has its own unique history of mummers' play, and adopted the term for the tradition from the English language.

== Etymology ==
The word mummer is sometimes explained to derive from Middle English mum ("silent") or Greek mommo ("mask"), but is more likely to be associated with Early New High German mummer ("disguised person", attested in Johann Fischart) and vermummen ("to wrap up, to disguise, to mask one's face"), which itself is derived from or came to be associated with mummen (first attested already in Middle High German by a prohibition in Mühlhausen, Thuringia, 1351) and mum(en)schanz, (Hans Sachs, Nuremberg, 16th century), these latter words originally referring to a game or throw (schanz) of dice. Ingrid Brainard argues that the English word "mummer" is ultimately derived from the Greek name Momus, a god of mockery and scoff.

== Overview ==
Mummers performing in Exeter, Devon in 1994

Mummers' and guisers' plays were formerly performed throughout much of English-speaking Great Britain and Ireland, spreading to other English-speaking parts of the world including Newfoundland and Saint Kitts and Nevis. There are a few surviving traditional teams of mummers in England and Ireland, but there have been many revivals of mummers' plays, often associated nowadays with morris and sword dance groups.

Broadly comic performances, the most common type features a doctor who has a magic potion able to resuscitate the vanquished character. Early scholars of folk drama, influenced by James Frazer's The Golden Bough, tended to view these plays as descendants of pre-Christian fertility ritual, but modern researchers have subjected this interpretation to criticism.

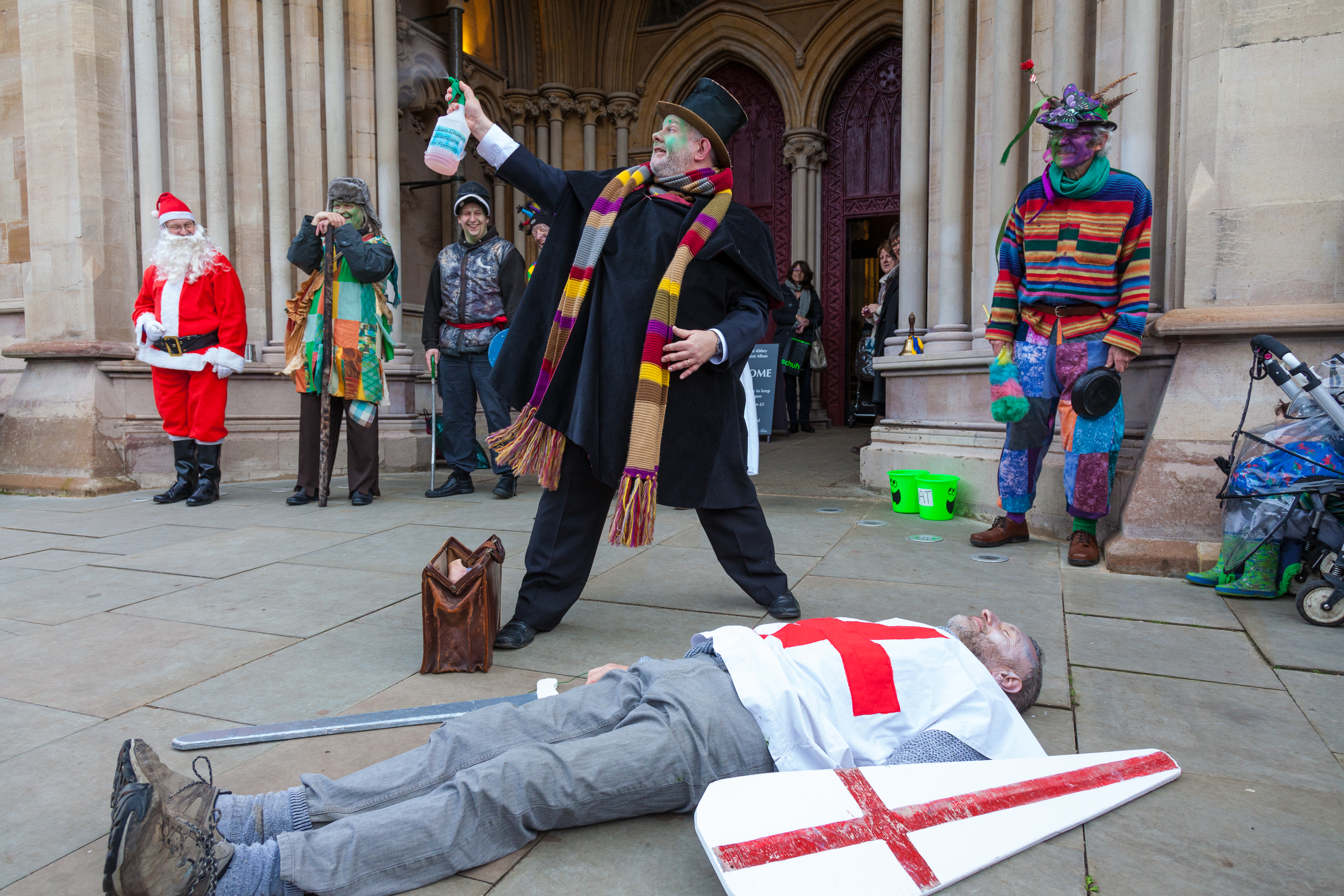
The Doctor brings St George back to life in a 2015 production by the St Albans Mummers.

The characters may be introduced in a series of short speeches (usually in rhyming couplets) or they may introduce themselves in the course of the play's action. The principal characters, presented in a wide variety of manners, are a hero, most commonly Saint George, King George, or Prince George (but Robin Hood in the Cotswolds and Galoshin in Scotland), and his chief opponent (known as the Turkish Knight in southern England, but with other names such as Slasher or Prince of Paradine elsewhere), and a quack Doctor who comes to restore the dead man to life. Other characters include: Old Father Christmas, who introduces some plays, the Fool, and Beelzebub or Little Devil Doubt (who demands money from the audience).

In Ynysmeudwy near Swansea groups of four boys dressed as Crwmpyn (hunchback) John, Indian Dark, Robin Hood and Doctor Brown took the play from house to house on Bonfire Night and were rewarded with money.

Despite the frequent presence of Saint George, the Dragon rarely appears although it is often mentioned. A dragon seems to have appeared in the Revesby Ploughboys' Play in 1779, along with a "wild worm" (possibly mechanical), but it had no words. In the few instances where the dragon appears and speaks its words can be traced back to a Cornish script published by William Sandys in 1833.

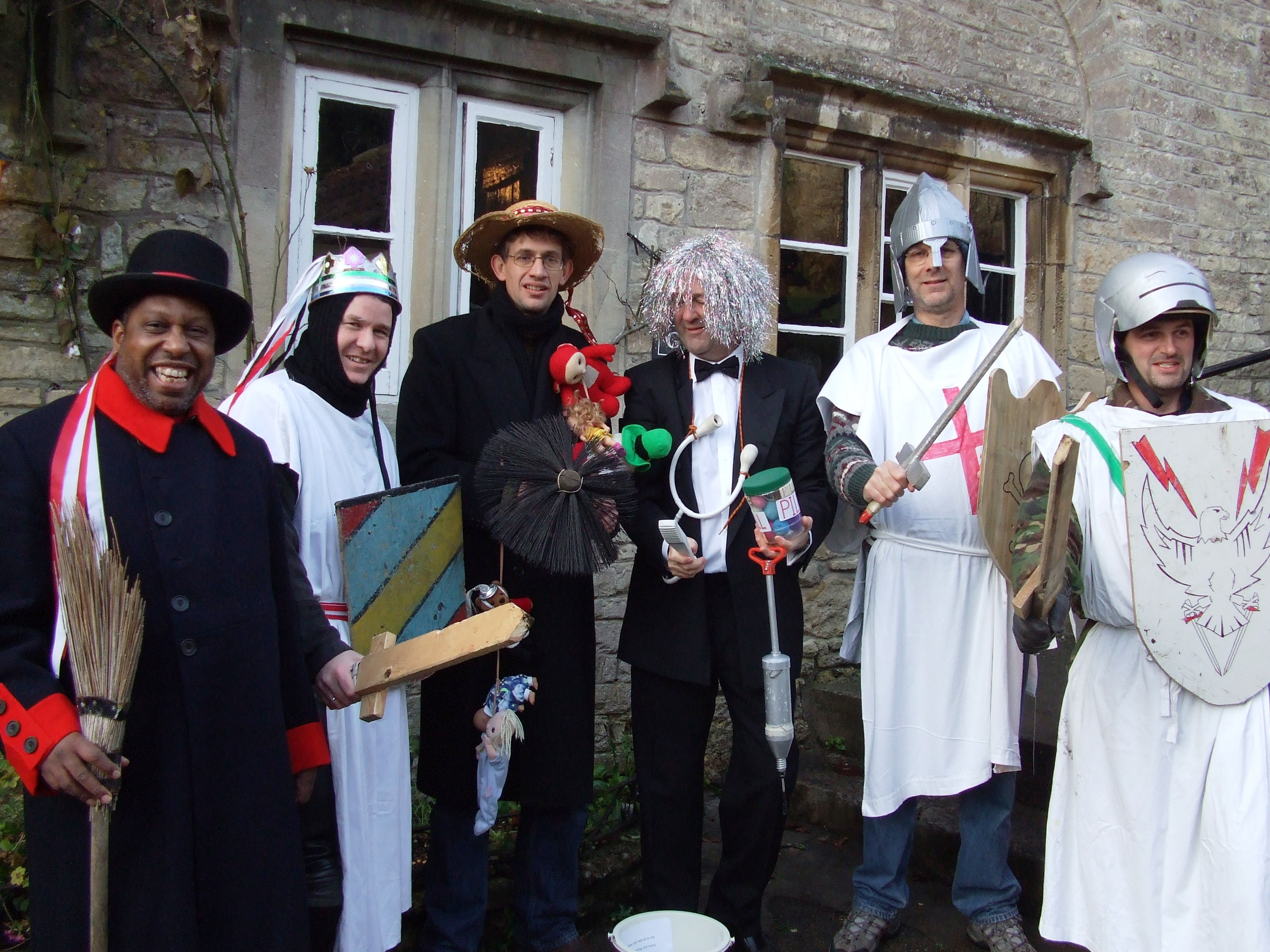
Weston Mummers perform at the Packhorse Inn, Southstoke on Boxing Day, 2007.

In 1418 a law was passed in London forbidding in the city "mumming, plays, interludes or any other disguisings with any feigned beards, painted visors, deformed or coloured visages in any wise, upon pain of imprisonment".

Mumming was a way of raising money and the play was taken round the big houses. Most Southern English versions end with the entrance of "Little Johnny Jack his wife and family on his back". Johnny, traditionally played by the youngest mummer in the group, first asks for food and then more urgently for money. Johnny Jack's wife and family were either dolls in a model house or sometimes a picture.

Midwinter Mummers at the Whittlesea Straw Bear, 2009

== Textual evidence ==
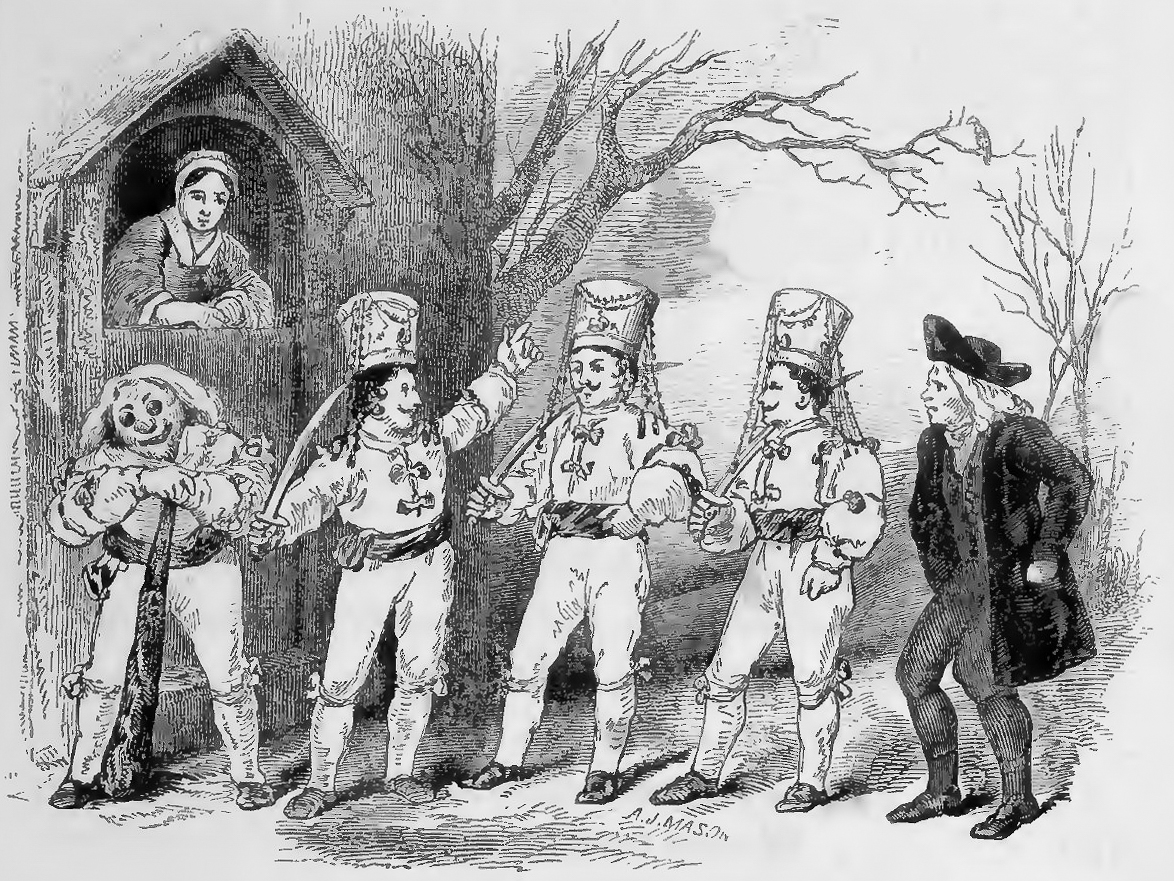
An 1852 depiction of an English mummers play

Although there are earlier hints (such as a fragmentary speech by St George from Exeter, Devon, which may date from 1737, although published in 1770), the earliest complete text of the "Doctor" play appears to be an undated chapbook of Alexander and the King of Egypt, published by John White (d. 1769) in Newcastle upon Tyne between 1746 and 1769. The fullest early version of a mummers' play text is probably the 1779 "Morrice Dancers'" play from Revesby, Lincolnshire. The full text ("A petygree of the Plouboys or modes dancers songs") is available online. Although performed at Christmas, this text is a forerunner of the East Midlands Plough Monday (see below) plays. A text from Islip, Oxfordshire, dates back to 1780.

A play text which had, until recently, been attributed to Mylor in Cornwall (much quoted in early studies of folk plays, such as The Mummers Play by R. J. E. Tiddy – published posthumously in 1923 – and The English Folk-Play (1933) by E. K. Chambers) has now been shown, by genealogical and other research, to have originated in Truro, Cornwall, around 1780. A play from an unknown locality in Cheshire, close to the border with Wales, dates from before 1788.

Chapbook versions of The Christmas Rhime or The Mummer's Own Book were published in Belfast, c.1803-1818. A mummers' play from Ballybrennan, County Wexford, Ireland, dating from around 1817–18, was published in 1863. It is from the 19th century that the bulk of recorded texts derive.

Mumming, at any rate in the South of England, had its heyday at the end of the 19th century and the earliest years of the 20th century. Most traditional mummers groups (known as "sides") stopped with the onset of the First World War, but not before they had come to the attention of folklorists. In the second half of the 20th century many groups were revived, mostly by folk music and dance enthusiasts. The revived plays are frequently taken around inns and public houses around Christmas time and the begging done for some charity rather than for the mummers themselves.

== Local seasonal variants ==
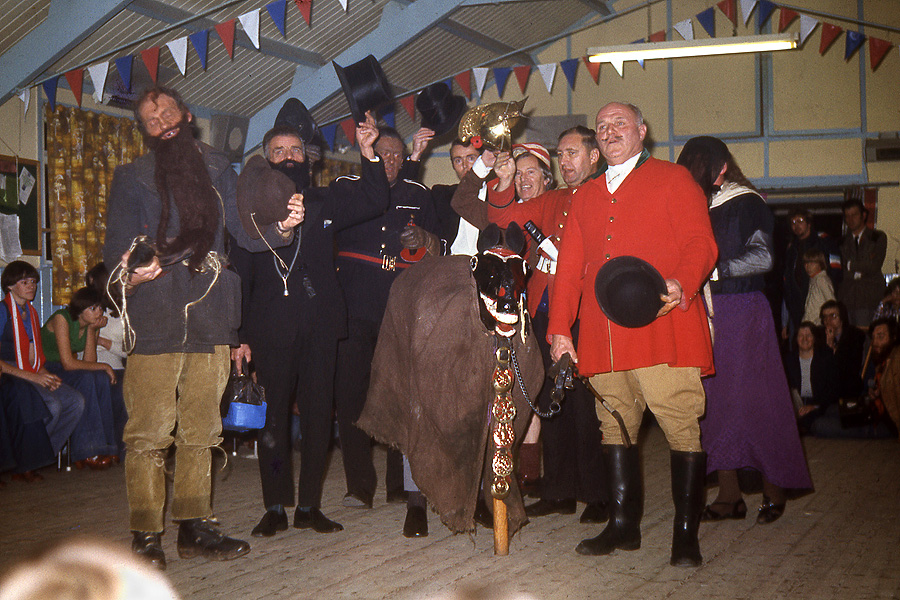
Antrobus Soul Cakers, in the mid-1970s, gathered round Dick, their Wild Horse

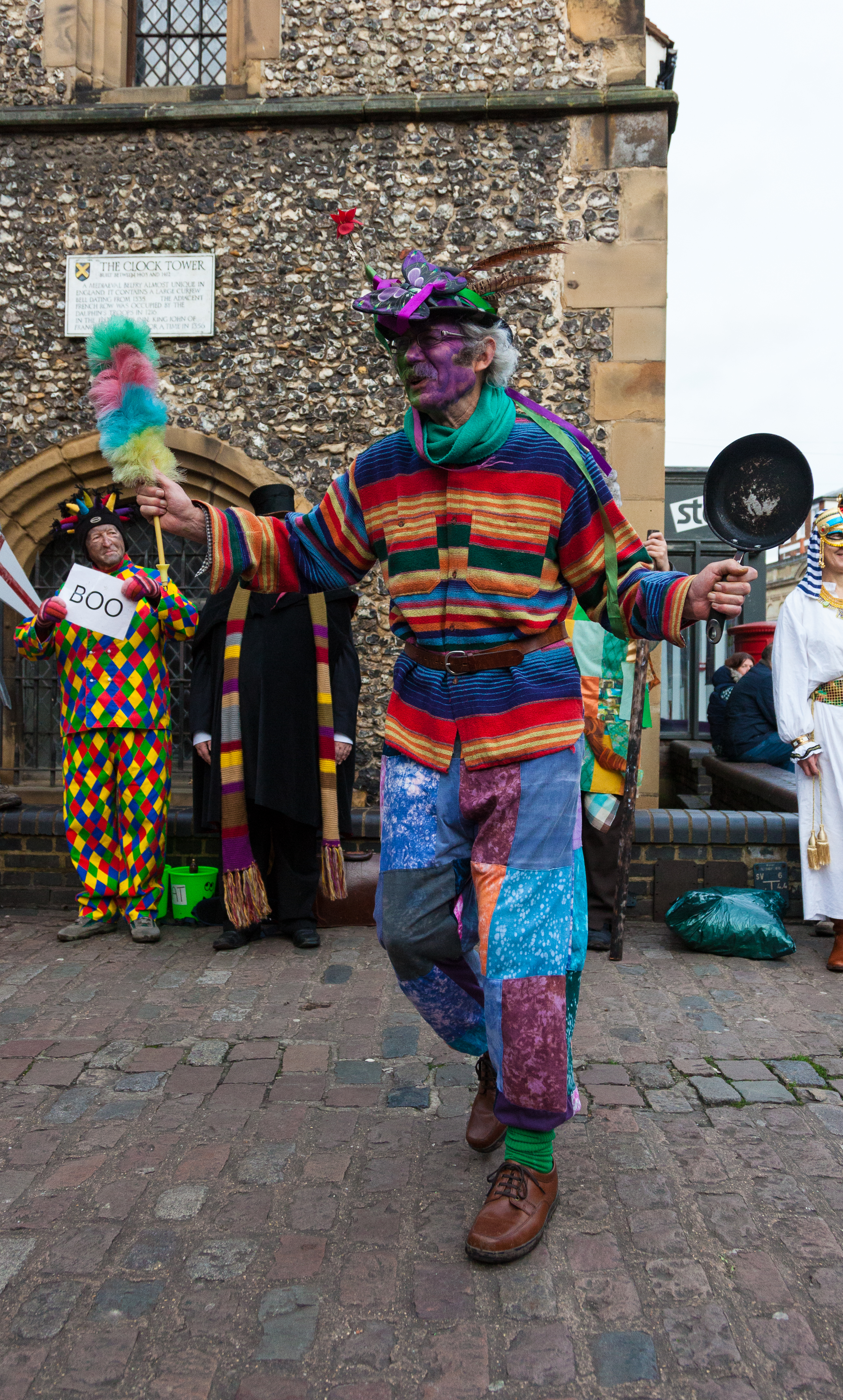
Beelzebub as a character in the mumming play St George and the Dragon by the St Albans Mummers, 2015

Although the main season for mumming throughout Britain was around Christmas, some parts of England had plays performed around All Souls' Day (known as Souling or soul-caking) or Easter (Pace-egging or Peace-egging). In north-eastern England the plays are traditionally associated with Sword dances or Rapper dances.

In some parts of Britain and Ireland the plays are traditionally performed on or near Plough Monday. These are therefore known as Plough plays and the performers as Plough-jags, Plough-jacks, Plough-bullocks, Plough-stots or Plough witches. The Plough plays of the East Midlands of England (principally Lincolnshire and Nottinghamshire) feature several different stock characters (including a Recruiting Sergeant, Tom Fool, Dame Jane and the "Lady bright and gay"). Tradition has it that ploughboys would take their plays from house to house and perform in exchange for money or gifts, some teams pulling a plough and threatened to plough up people's front gardens or path if they did not pay up. Examples of the play have been found in Denmark since the late 1940s.

=== England ===
Around Sheffield and in nearby parts of northern Derbyshire and Nottinghamshire a dramatised version of the well-known Derby Ram folksong, known as the Derby Tup (another word for ram), has been performed, since at least 1895, by teams of boys. The brief play is usually introduced by two characters, an old man and an old woman ("Me and our owd lass"). The Tup was usually represented by a boy, bent over forwards, covered with a sack, and carrying a broomstick with a rough, wooden sheep's head attached. The Tup was killed by a Butcher, and sometimes another boy held a basin to catch the "blood". There is a Sheffield version where the Tup is killed and then brought back to life by the Doctor. This is the main play performed by the Northstow Mummers based in Cambridge.

An 'Owd 'Oss play (Old Horse), another dramatised folksong in Yorkshire, was also known from roughly the same area, in the late 19th and early 20th centuries, around Christmas. The custom persisted until at least 1970, when it was performed in private houses and pubs in Dore on New Year's Day. A group of men accompanied a hobby horse (either a wooden head, with jaws operated by strings, or a real horse's skull, painted black and red, mounted on a wooden pole so that its snapping jaws could be operated by a man stooping under a cloth to represent the horse's body) and sang a version of The Old Horse or Poor Old Horse, which describes a decrepit horse that is close to death.

In Lincolnshire, similar traditions were known as 'plough plays', many of these were collected by the folklorist Ethel Rudkin.

=== Ireland ===
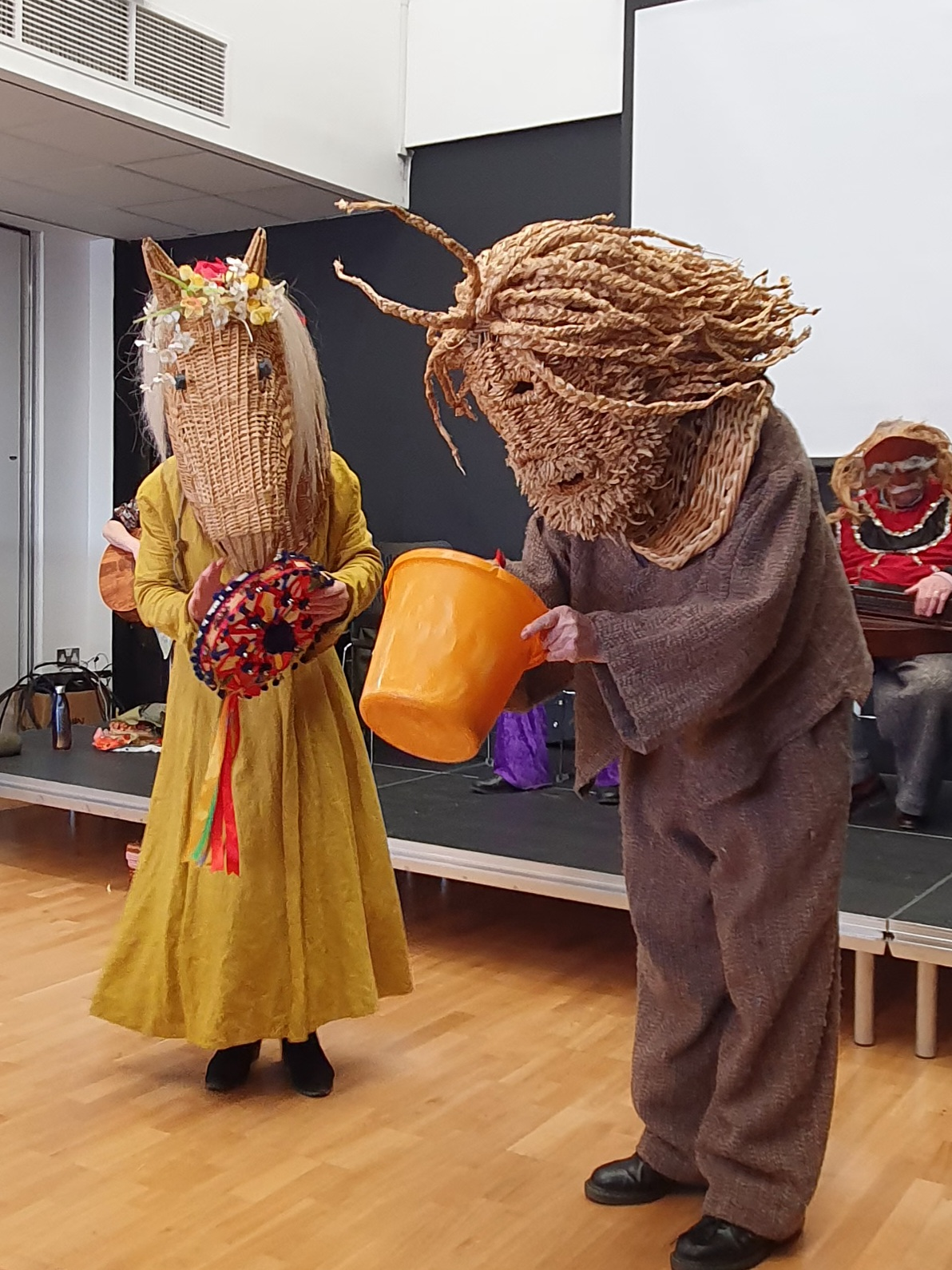
The Armagh Rhymers performing at Aonach Mhacha in March 2023

All known Irish play scripts are in English though Irish custom and tradition have permeated mumming ceremony with famous characters from Irish history: Colmcille, Brian Boru, Art MacMorrough, Owen Roe O'Neill, Sarsfield and Wolfe Tone. The mummers are similar but distinct from the other traditions such as wrenboys. The main characters are usually the Captain, Beelzebub, Saint Patrick, Prince George, Oliver Cromwell, The Doctor and Miss Funny.

The tradition of the mummers' play is still present in areas of Ireland including County Fermanagh, County Tyrone, County Wexford, and the Fingal area of County Dublin. The practice was discouraged by the Catholic Church in the early 20th century, but appears to have continued despite this condemnation. In 1935, the Carne Mummers were arrested for their street performance under the Dance Halls Act. In Fingal, the modern form of mummering was re-established by the Fingal Mummers in the 1980s, and is now documented as part of Ireland's National Inventory of Intangible Cultural Heritage. A festival is held each October in Fingal by a local school, Scoil Seamus Ennis, which has hosted mummering troupes from across Ireland and England. The group, The Armagh Rhymers, have been performing mummers' plays and other performances inspired by the traditional form since the 1970s.

=== Scotland ===
The royal treasurer's accounts include many references to performances at the royal court and in towns and villages during progresses. James IV rewarded "gysaris" or guisers who performed at Melrose on 27 December 1496.

In 1831, Sir Walter Scott published a rhyme which had been used as a prelude to the Papa Stour Sword Dance, Shetland in around 1788. It features seven characters, Saint George, Saint James, Saint Dennis, Saint David, Saint Patrick, Saint Anthony and Saint Andrew, the Seven Champions of Christendom. All the characters are introduced in turn by the Master, St. George. There is no real interplay between the characters and no combat or cure, so it is more of a "calling-on song" than a play. Some of the characters dance solos as they are introduced, then all dance a longsword dance together, which climaxes with their swords being meshed together to form a "shield". They each dance with the shield upon their head, then it is laid on the floor and they withdraw their swords to finish the dance. St. George makes a short speech to end the performance.

In the 1950s, A.L. Taylor collected surviving fragments of seasonal Scottish folk plays he described as "Galoshens" or "Galatians". Later, Emily Lyle recorded the oral history of fourteen people from the lowlands of Scotland recounting their memories of "Galoshin" dramas. Galoshin is the hero in a drama in the tradition of Robin Hood plays. Building on this research, Brian Hayward investigated the geographical distribution of the play in Scotland, and published Galoshins: the Scottish Folk Play, which includes several maps showing the locations where each version was performed. These are or were largely across the Central Belt of Scotland, with a strange and unexplained "outlier" at Ballater in Aberdeenshire. The Meadows Mummers are an all-female troupe who perform at local festivals inspired by both these writers, and by folk play workshops at the Scottish Storytelling Centre. In 2019 they performed at the Scots Music School in Barga, Italy.

=== Isle of Man ===
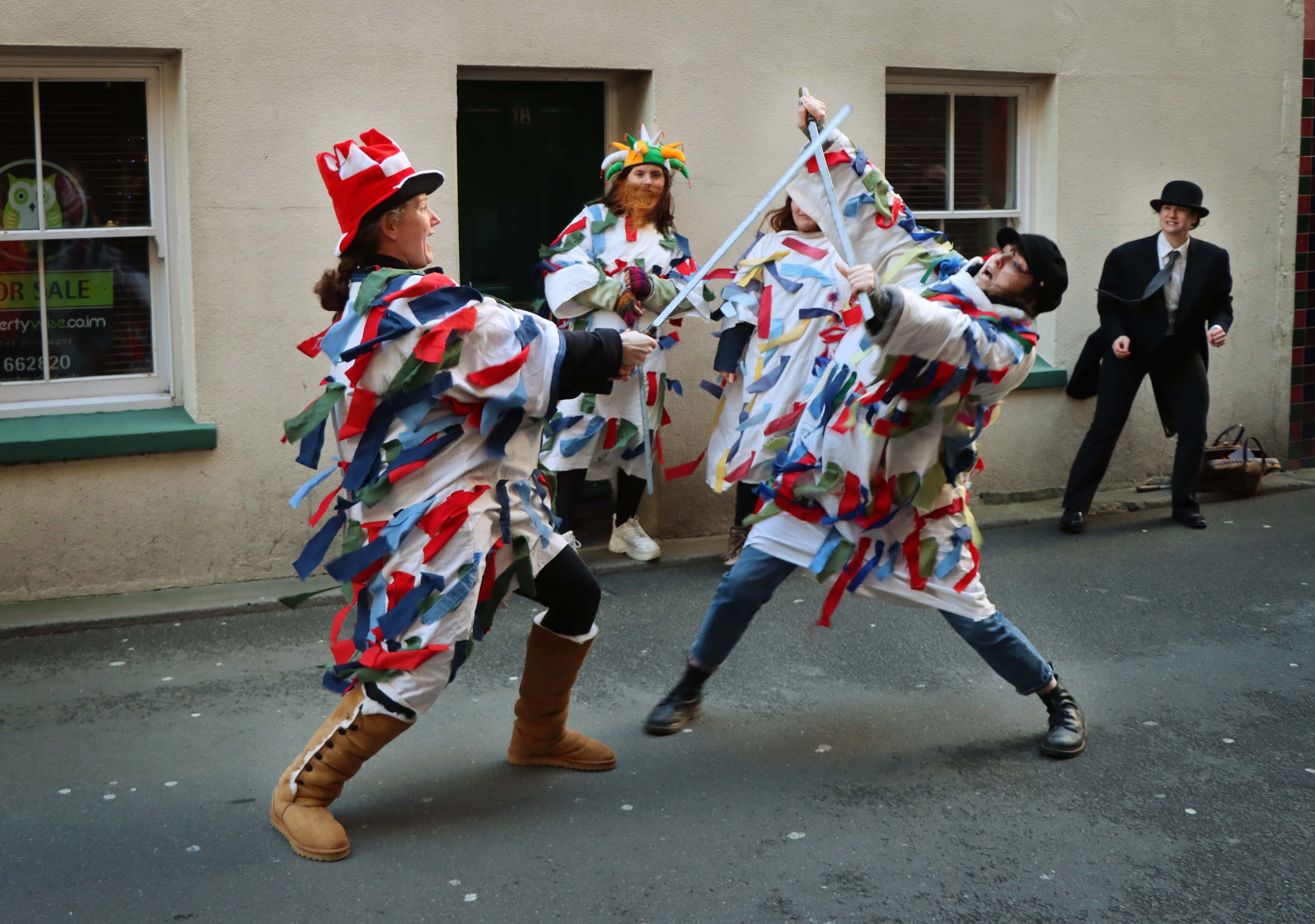
The Saints fight in a performance of the White Boys in Ramsey, 2020

First recorded in 1832, the Manx White Boys play features a song and a sword dance at its conclusion. Although the key traditional characters include St. George, St. Patrick and others, modern versions frequently adapt the play to contemporary political concerns. Characters featured since the 1990s include Sir MHK, Sir Banker, Expert and Estate Agent. A a book on the White Boys compiled and edited by Stephen Miller was published in 2010; "Who wants to see the White Boys act?" The Mumming Play in the Isle of Man: A Compendium of Sources. It continues to be performed on the Saturday before Christmas each year.

== Mummers in fiction ==
Thomas Hardy's novel The Return of the Native (1878) has a fictional depiction of a mummers' play on Edgon Heath. It was based on the author's childhood experiences.

Leo Tolstoy's novel War and Peace (1869) has a depiction of mummers, including Nikolai Rostov, Natasha Rostova, and Sonya Rostova, making house-to-house visits. They are depicted as a boisterous crowd dancing and laughing in outrageous costumes where men are dressed as women and women are dressed as men.

Ngaio Marsh's detective story Off with His Head (1957) is set around a particular version of the Guiser play / Sword Dance, the fictional "Dance of the Five Sons", performed on the "Sword Wednesday" of the Winter Solstice. The characters used in that dance are describes in great detail, in particular "The Fool", "The Hobbyhorse" and "The teaser" (called "Betty").

George RR Martin's A Song of Ice and Fire often features and references mummers, with characters regularly referring to a comical, bungled, unbelievable, or manufactured event as a "mummer's farce".

== Music ==
There are several traditional songs associated with mumming plays; the "calling-on" songs of sword dance teams are related:

- "The Singing of the Travels" by the Symondsbury Mummers, appears on SayDisc CD-SDL425 English Customs and Traditions (1997) along with an extract from the Antrobus, Cheshire, Soulcakers' Play
  - It also appears on the World Library of Folk and Primitive Music. Vol 1. England, Rounder 1741, CD (1998/reis), cut#16b
- "The Singing of the Travels" was also recorded by the Silly Sisters (Maddy Prior and June Tabor).
- "A Calling-on Song" by Steeleye Span from their first album Hark! The Village Wait is based on a sword-dance or pace-egg play calling-on song, in which the characters are introduced one by one
- "The Mummers' Dance," a hit song from the album The Book of Secrets by Loreena McKennitt, refers to a springtime traditional mummers' play as performed in Ireland.
- "England in Ribbons", a song by Hugh Lupton and Chris Wood is based on the characters of a traditional English mummers' play. It gave its name to a two-hour programme of traditional and traditionally-rooted English music, broadcast by BBC Radio 3 as the culmination of a whole day of English music, on St George's Day 2006
- "The Mummer's Song", performed by the Canadian folk group Great Big Sea, but originally written by the Newfoundland folk band Simani, is an arrangement of the traditional song "The Mummer's Carol", which details the mummering tradition in Newfoundland and Labrador. A hip-hop version by M.W.A. (Mummers With Attitude) was released in 2014.
- Mummer is the title of a 1983 album by the English rock band XTC.

== See also ==
- Balliol rhyme
- Blackface and Morris dancing
- Căluşari Dancers of Romania
- Careto
- Clown
- Commedia dell'arte
- Courir de Mardi Gras
- Jester
- Koledovanie
- Kukeri Mummers of Bulgaria
- Marshfield Mummers
- Mystery play
- Pantomime
- Revels
- St George's Day in England
- Wassailing
- Wrenboys
