= Walpole Drive Halt =

Railway station in Isle of Man, the UK

Walpole Drive Imman Walpole
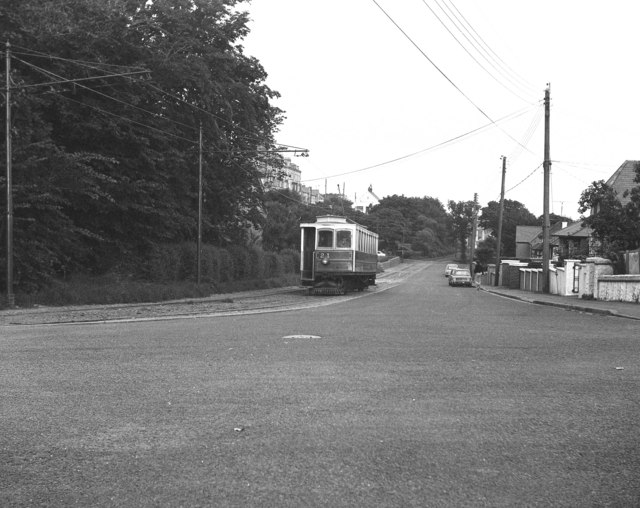

General information
- Location: Ramsey, Isle Of Man
- Coordinates: 54.3166844°N 4.3762989°W
- Pole Nos.: 884-885
- System: Manx Electric Railway
- Owner: Isle Of Man Railways
- Line: North Line
- Platforms: Ground Level
- Tracks: Two Running Lines

Construction
- Parking: None

History
- Opened: 19??
- Former names: Manx Electric Railway Co.
Location

Walpole Drive Halt (Manx: Stadd Imman Walpole) is a diminutive urban request stop on the northern section of the Manx Electric Railway on the Isle of Man.

== Traffic ==
The halt caters almost exclusively for local traffic. Due to the nature of the tramway's construction, the cars can stop and drop off almost anywhere and will do so within reason. For this reason a great number of localised stopping places have built up since the line was completed, many at the intersection of smaller road crossings and the like. The crossings/halts usually take the name of the nearby farm or nearest road as is the case here, but these unofficial halts never appear in timetable materials or have nameboards fitted to show their names. Many do however now carry bus stop-type signs attached to traction poles, and these were fitted in line with then-management policy in 1999.

== Location ==
The halt here is located on the only real "urban" stretch of the line and until relaid in 2002 featured the only grooved tramway rail on the line. Also along this section were different traction poles mounted to the side of the running lines (rather than between them as is characteristic on the rest of the line). These poles were more ornate and featured more decorative metalwork, but were replaced as part of an ongoing track renewal programme.

== Route ==
Preceding station	Manx Electric Railway	Following station
Ballure towards Derby Castle	Douglas–Ramsey	Queens Drive towards Ramsey Station

== See also ==
- List of Manx Electric Railway stations

== Sources ==
- Manx Manx Electric Railway Stopping Places (2002) Manx Electric Railway Society
- Island Island Images: Manx Electric Railway Pages (2003) Jon Wornham
- Official Official Tourist Department Page (2009) Isle Of Man Heritage Railways
