= Cashtal yn Ard =

Neolithic chambered tomb on the Isle of Man

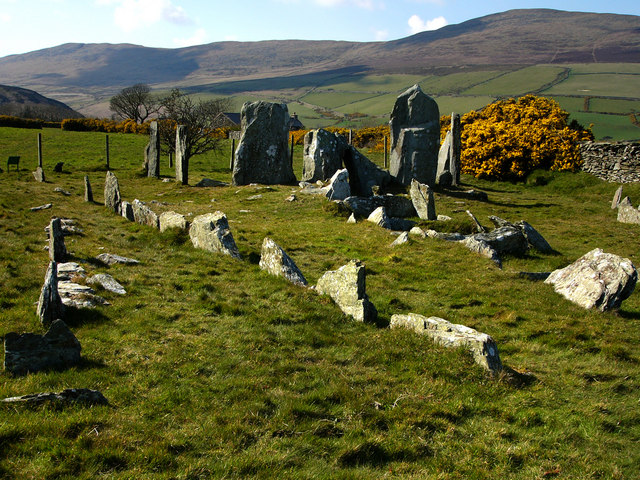
- View of Cashtal yn Ard burial chamber.

- Map of the Isle of Man showing the location of Cashtal yn Ard
- Interactive map of Cashtal yn Ard
- 54.27803°N 4.35912°W
- Periods: Neolithic
- Location: Cornaa, Maughold, Isle of Man
- Region: Isle of Man

Cashtal yn Ard (Castle of the Heights) is a Neolithic chambered tomb in Cornaa, in the parish of Maughold in the Isle of Man. It is situated on a low hill overlooking much of the surrounding parish of Maughold and across to the Lake District in England. The cairn was excavated in the 1930s and again in 1999. It is one of the most significant megalithic tombs on both the Isle of Man and Britain.

== Name ==
The name in the Manx language means Castle of the Heights referring to the site's relative elevation. An earlier name for the site was 'Cashtal y Mucklagh y Vagileragh', meaning the Castle of the Field Pigsty. This may refer to how the tomb forecourt had been adapted for the raising of pigs.

The tomb has also previously been named Ballachrink Cairn.

== Description ==
The tomb has been dated to 2000 BC and is one of the best preserved Neolithic monuments on the Isle of Man. The site is large, with a west–east orientation and with an overall length of 39m. The tomb is located on a low hill that has extensive views of the surrounding landscape. This may have symbolically represented the contrast between the activities of everyday life that likely took place on lower land, with the ritual activities that took place in the hills. It is likely that the tomb was originally constructed as a single burial chamber, but as successive significant members of the community died, the site was expanded to accommodate them.

The tomb consists of a west facing open forecourt that leads to five stone chambers in the east. The forecourt measures 6.7m x 5.8m and has been restored. It is made up of large stones of which the largest is 2.3m in height. The east facing stone chambers are separated by lateral standing stone slabs. The highest of the stones forming the chambers is 1m, from which they then reduce in size towards the east. The average width of each chambers is 1.2m.

The tomb was first described in the early 19th century when it was still mostly intact. The main body of the cairn was damaged by the middle of the 19th century when several of the stone slabs that made up the 1.2m high rectangular burial cairn were taken to be used for the building of nearby houses. This has exposed the five smaller chambers.

== Excavations ==
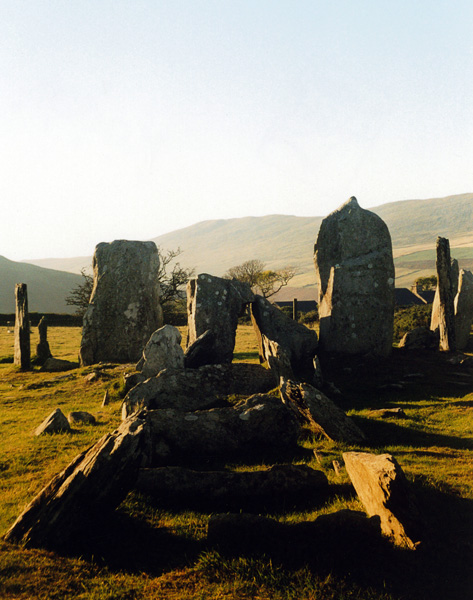
Cashtal yn Ard burial chambers, which once were covered over with stone slabs.

Archaeologists H. J. Fleure and G. J. H. Neely excavated the site in the 1930s. Flints and shards of Neolithic pottery were discovered during investigations of the chambers, as well as at least 125 white sea pebbles which have been found at many Manx archaeological sites. No bones were found during this excavation, however an earlier antiquarian investigation was described by Llewellynn Jewitt in 1885 who reported the discovery of bone fragments of a young person:

under side stones, were pieces of bones; on the north, portions of a skull, suture open; upper jaw bone, with teeth regular and sound of a young person, and other fragments; also pieces of two different urns, one of crushed granite and black, about two-thirds of an inch thick, the other thicker, red, and of more earthy material. Near the east end was a cist without covering stone or west side stone, with portions of bone in the north, and on the south end fragments of a smaller urn of crushed granite, thickly spangled with mica.

Any other human remains may have been removed during earlier disturbances.

Fleure and Neely highlighted the resemblance between Cashtal yn Ard and the cairns of Giants' Tombs in Sardinia and Bridestones in Cheshire, England.
