= Ballastowell Halt =

Railway station in Isle of Man, UK

Ballastowell Balley Stowell
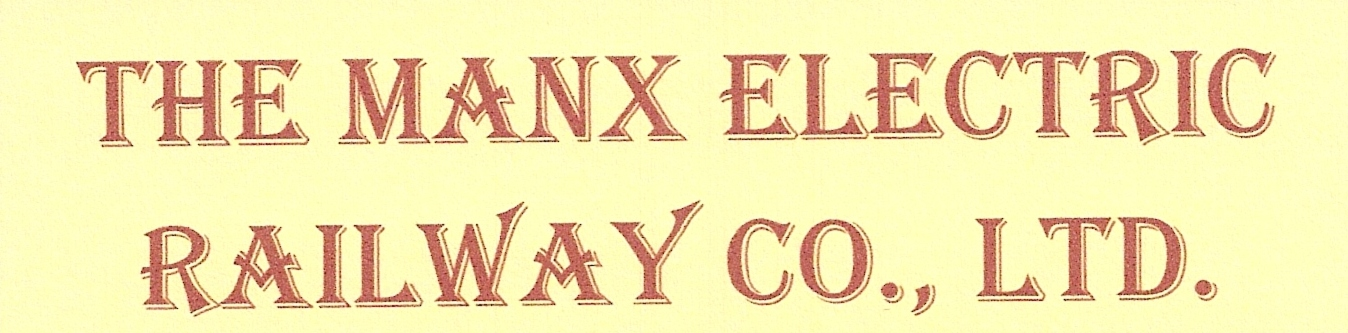

General information
- Location: Ramsey, Isle Of Man
- Coordinates: 54.3194884°N 4.3796077°W
- Pole Nos.: 898-899
- System: Manx Electric Railway
- Owner: Isle Of Man Heritage Railways
- Platforms: Ground Level
- Tracks: Two Running Lines

Construction
- Structure type: None
- Parking: None

History
- Opened: 19??
- Former names: Manx Electric Railway Co., Ltd.
Location

Ballastowell Halt (Manx: Stadd Valley Stowell) is the final request stop on the Manx Electric Railway on the Isle of Man.

== Location ==
Catering almost exclusively for local traffic, this halt typifies the inter-urban nature of the final stretch of the line. Due to the nature of the tramway's construction, the cars can stop and drop off almost anywhere and will do so within reason. For this reason a great number of localised stopping places have built up since the line was completed, many at the intersection of smaller crossings like this one.

== Naming ==
Halts such as this usually take the name of the farm or place name as is the case here, but these unofficial halts never appear in timetable materials or have nameboards fitted to show their names. Many do however now carry bus stop-type signs attached to traction poles, and these were fitted in line with then-management policy in 1999.

== Route ==
Preceding station	Manx Electric Railway	Following station
Queens Drive towards Derby Castle	Douglas–Ramsey	Ramsey Station Terminus

== Also ==
Manx Electric Railway Stations

== Sources ==
- Manx Manx Electric Railway Stopping Places (2002) Manx Electric Railway Society
- Island Island Images: Manx Electric Railway Pages (2003) Jon Wornham
- Official Tourist Department Page (2009) Isle Of Man Heritage Railways
