= Queens Drive Halt =

Railway station in Isle of Man, the UK

Queens Drive Imman y Ven-Rein
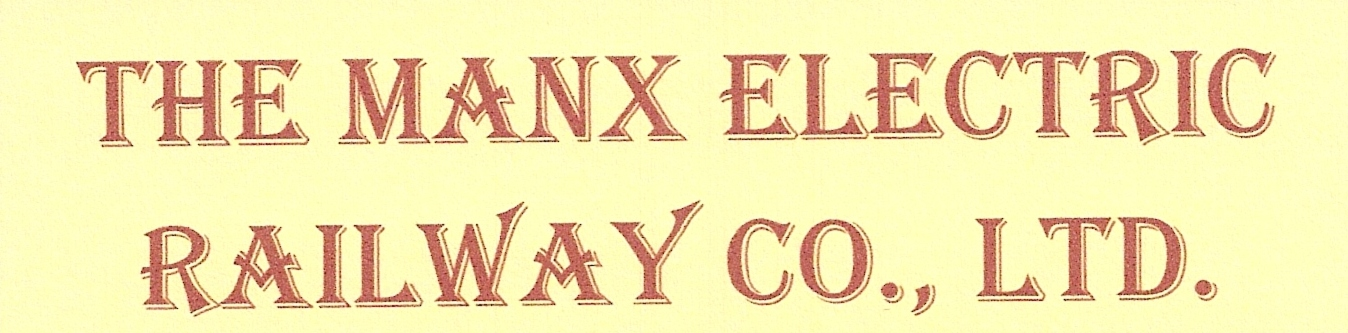

General information
- Location: Ramsey, Isle Of Man
- Coordinates: 54.3178°N 4.3775°W
- Pole Nos.: 889-890
- System: Manx Electric Railway
- Owner: Isle Of Man Railways
- Line: North Line
- Platforms: Ground Level
- Tracks: Two Running Lines

Construction
- Parking: None

History
- Opened: 1899
- Former names: Manx Electric Railway Co.
Location

Queens Drive Halt (Manx: Stadd Imman y Ven-Rein) is an intermediate stopping place on the northern section of the Manx Electric Railway on the Isle of Man.

== Location ==
Due to the nature of the tramway's construction, the cars can stop and drop off almost anywhere and will do so within reason. For this reason a great number of localised stopping places have built up since the line was completed, many at the intersection of road crossings like this one. The crossings/halts usually take the name of the nearest farm, landmark or road as is the case here, but these unofficial halts never appear in timetable materials or have nameboards fitted to show their names.

== Queens Pier ==
The stop here serves Queens Drive and other parts of Ramsey, and is the closest stop to the famous Queen's Pier, landmark of the town. At this point the line becomes inter-urban, running parallel to the roadway, notably featuring traction poles mounted at the side of the line, rather than between the running lines as is standard elsewhere.

== Route ==
Preceding station	Manx Electric Railway	Following station
Walpole Drive towards Derby Castle	Douglas–Ramsey	Ballastowell towards Ramsey Station

== Also ==
Manx Electric Railway Stations

== Sources ==
- Manx Manx Electric Railway Stopping Places (2002) Manx Electric Railway Society
- Island Island Images: Manx Electric Railway Pages (2003) Jon Wornham
- Official Tourist Department Page (2009) Isle Of Man Heritage Railways
