= Maughold (parish) =

Parish on the Isle of Man

Coordinates: 54.29861°N 4.31761°W

Maughold: Manx: Maghal
- Parish of Maughold, Isle of Man
- Population: 985
- OS grid reference: SC4919891716
- Sheading: Garff
- Crown dependency: Isle of Man
- Post town: ISLE OF MAN
- Postcode district: IM7
- House of Keys: Garff

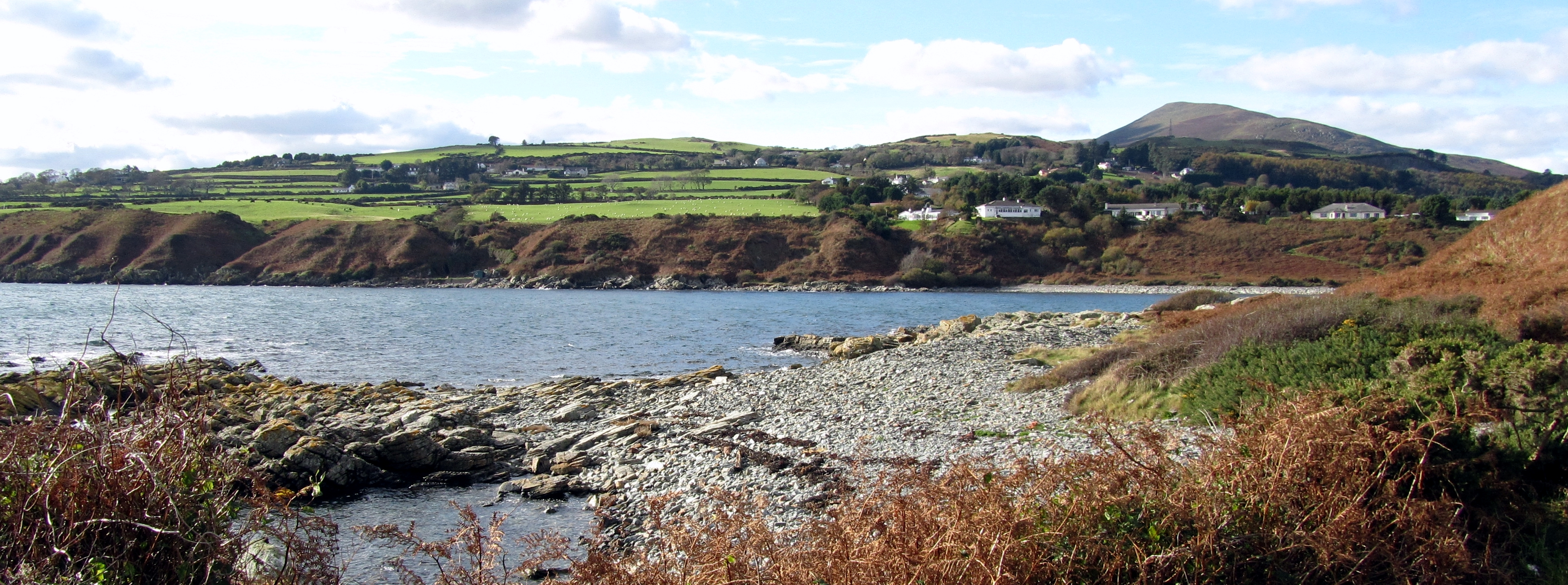
View of Port Mooar, Maughold with North Barrule in the background.

Maughold (/ˈmækəld/ MAK-əld; Manx: Maghal) is one of the seventeen parishes of the Isle of Man. It is named for St Maughold, the island's patron saint.

It is located on the east of the island (part of the traditional South Side division) in the sheading of Garff. Administratively, part of the historic parish of Maughold is now within Ramsey town. The settlement of Ballure borders Ramsey. Maughold village and Glen Mona are other settlements in the parish.

== Local government ==
Since 1865, a small area in the north of the historic parish of Maughold has been part of the separate town of Ramsey, with its own town commissioners.

Since May 2016, the remainder of the historic parish of Maughold has been an electoral ward of a single Garff local authority, formed by merging the former village district of Laxey with the parish districts of Lonan and Maughold.

The Captain of the Parish since 2018 is Clare Christian, a former President of Tynwald.

== Politics ==
Maughold parish is part of the Garff constituency, which elects two members to the House of Keys. Since 1867 Ramsey has formed its own constituency.

== History ==
There is a Neolithic chambered tomb in the parish at Cashtal yn Ard.

== Geography ==
The small village of Maughold lies on the coast some three miles south-east of Ramsey. A proportion of the land in the area has been in Manx National Heritage ownership since 1965. Kirk Maughold (the parish church for the area) contains a number of historically important Celtic crosses, suggesting that it was the site of an early Christian monastery.

Maughold Head to the east of the village is the easternmost point on the island and has a lighthouse. There is mountainous terrain on the landward side of the parish; the parish includes most of the North Barrule, the second highest hill on the island.

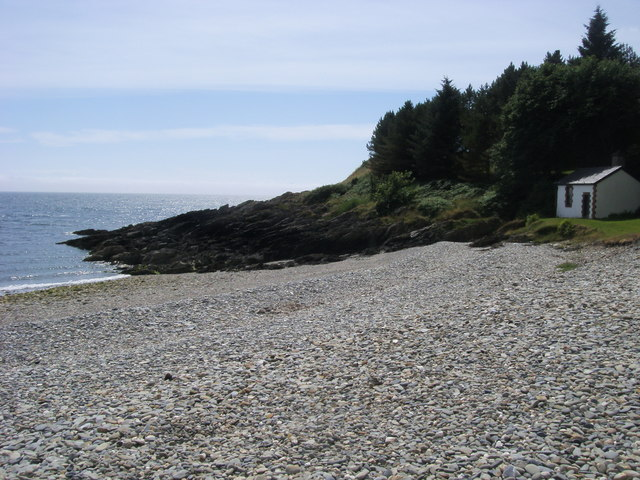
Port Cornaa cable hut

The inlet at Port e Vullen was once the location of the telegraph cable between the Isle of Man and St Bees, Cumbria before it was moved in 1875 to the inlet at Port Cornaa, both within the parish of Maughold.

== Demographics ==
The 2016 census of recorded a parish population of 985, an increase of 0.8% from 977 in 2011.

Maughold parish (census)
Year	1996	2001	2006	2011	2016	2021
Pop.	858	941	950	977	985	952
±%	—	+9.7%	+1.0%	+2.8%	+0.8%	−3.4%
