= Maughold (village) =

Village on the Isle of Man

Coordinates: 54.2986634°N 4.3184130°W

Maughold: Manx: Maghal
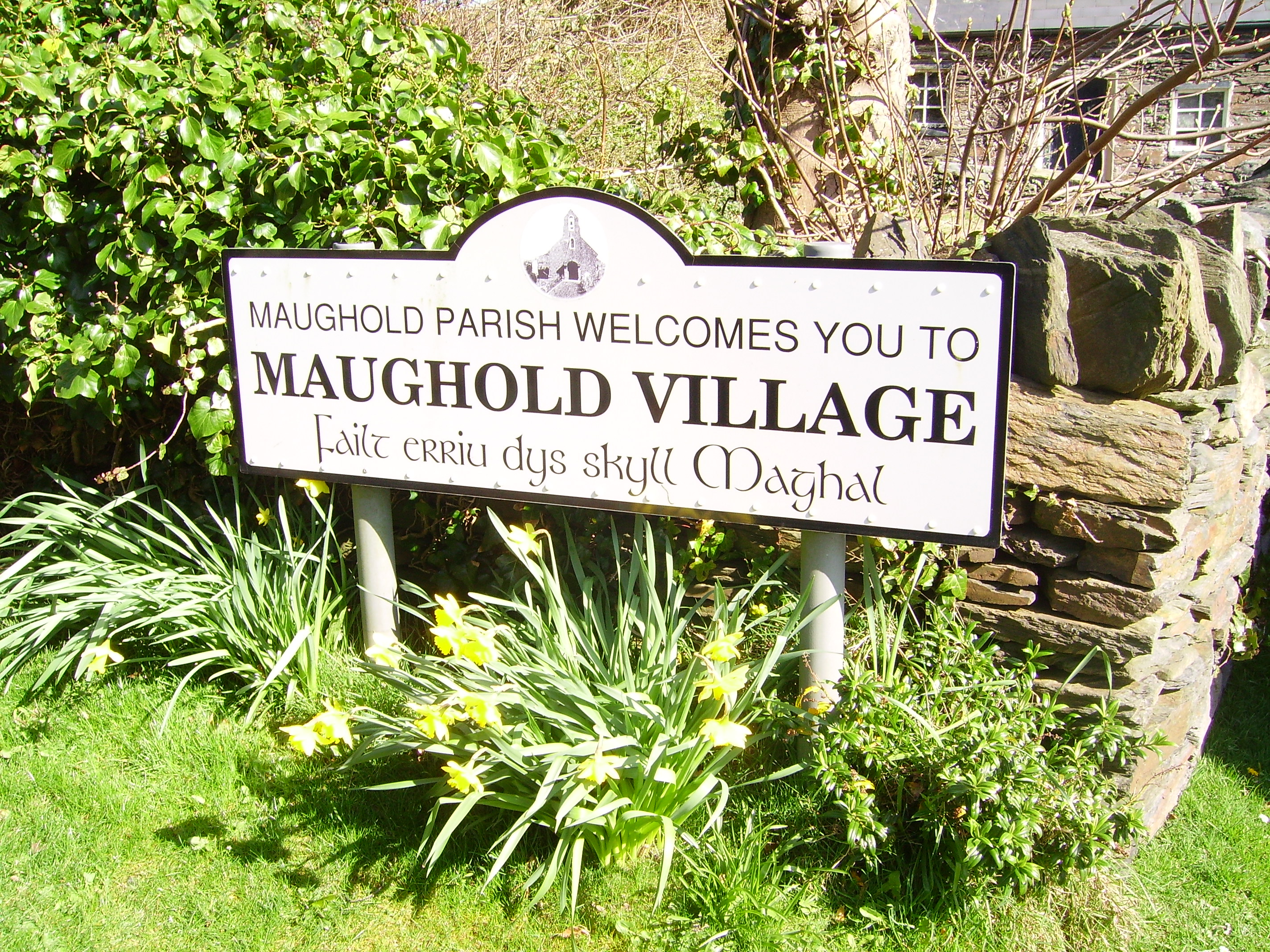
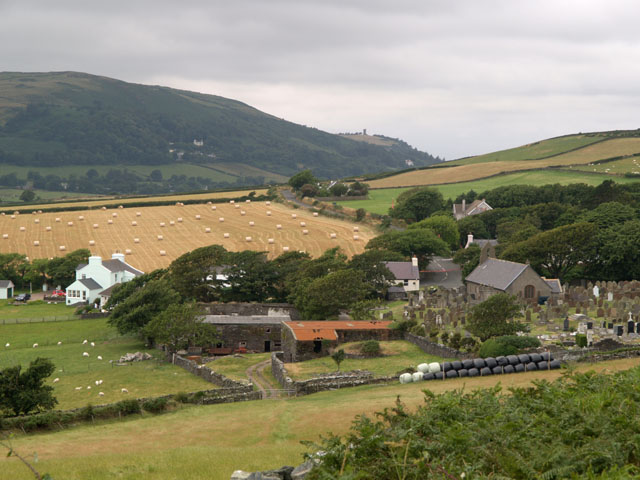

- Location within the Isle of Man
- Parish: Maughold
- Sheading: Garff
- Crown dependency: Isle of Man
- Postcode district: IM7
- Police: Isle of Man
- Fire: Isle of Man
- Ambulance: Isle of Man

Maughold (Manx: Maghal), often referred to as Maughold Village, is a small village in the parish of the same name in the east of the Isle of Man. Situated at a sharp bend on the A15 just inland from the coast at Maughold Head and about 3 miles east of Ramsey, the settlement is centred around Kirk Maughold Parish Church and churchyard, with a handful of dwellings on either side.

Maughold Village Green hosts events such as Maughold Parish Day.

== History ==
Maughold village was historically "a place of considerable importance, but it is now quite insignificant". Like the parish, it derives its name from St Maughold, who arrived at Maughold Head in the 5th century. As a result, the location became "much frequented by pilgrims". Maughold is possibly the Isle of Man's oldest "monastic" settlement.

=== Kirk Maughold Parish Church and churchyard ===
On top of the original Celtic monastery, the current Kirk Maughold Parish Church was built in the 11th or 12th century in the typical Manx style. The parish church has a churchyard of 4 acres, with the stone wall marking the site of the monastery. The churchyard contains St Maughold's Well, the ruins of former sanctuary accommodations, and the ruins of three keills. The crosshouse houses the island's largest collection of Manx and Norse stone crosses. The crosses include both Christian and pagan allusions.

More recent additions to the churchyard include a World War I and World War II memorial and an obelisk designed by Archibald Knox and dedicated to Hall Caine.

== Notable people ==
- Anne Craine (born 1954), politician, grew up in Maughold village
- J. P. Donleavy (1926–2017), author, lived in Maughold with his family in the 1960s
- Mera Royle (born 1999), harpist and composer, grew up in Maughold
