= Ballure Halt =

Railway station on the Isle of Man

Ballure Ballure
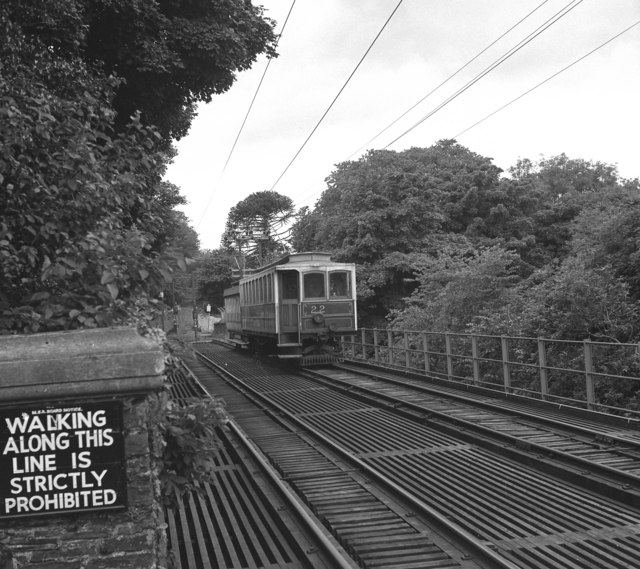

General information
- Location: Maughold, Isle Of Man
- Coordinates: 54.3138°N 4.3743°W
- Pole Nos.: 869-870
- System: Manx Electric Railway
- Owner: Isle Of Man Railways
- Line: North Line
- Platforms: Ground Level
- Tracks: Two Running Lines

Construction
- Parking: None

History
- Opened: 19??
- Former names: Manx Electric Railway Co.
Location

Ballure Halt (Manx: Stadd Ballure) is an intermediate stopping place on the northern section of the Manx Electric Railway on the Isle of Man.

== Location ==
Catering almost exclusively for local traffic and located close to viaduct of the same name, in Ballure on the outskirts of Ramsey. Due to the nature of the tramway's construction, the cars can stop and drop off almost anywhere and will do so within reason. For this reason a great number of localised stopping places have built up since the line was completed, many at the intersection of farmer's crossings like this one.

== Naming ==
Crossings like this usually take the name of nearby areas - in this case the valley and glen of the same name, but these unofficial halts never appear in timetable materials or have nameboards fitted to show their names. Many do however now carry bus stop-type signs attached to traction poles, and these were fitted in line with then-management policy in 1999.

== Terminus ==
When the line first reached the northern town in 1899 this formed the terminus whilst the viaduct crossing the deep valley was constructed. Maintenance pits may still be found in the undergrowth here showing where tramcar sheds once stood.

== Route ==
Preceding station	Manx Electric Railway	Following station
Belle Vue towards Derby Castle	Douglas–Ramsey	Walpole Drive towards Ramsey Station

== Also ==
Manx Electric Railway Stations

== Sources ==
- Manx Manx Electric Railway Stopping Places (2002) Manx Electric Railway Society
- Island Island Images: Manx Electric Railway Pages (2003) Jon Wornham
- Official Tourist Department Page (2009) Isle Of Man Heritage Railways
