= Ballure, Isle of Man =

Coordinates: 54.31502°N 4.374004°W

Ballure
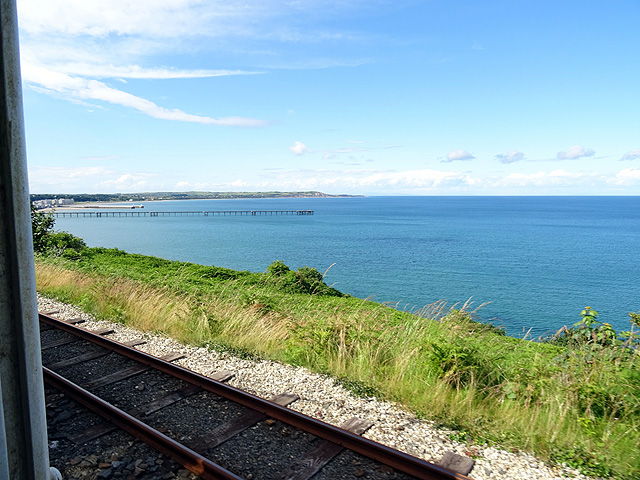
- The coast at Ballure

- Location within the Isle of Man
- Parish: Maughold
- Sheading: Garff
- Crown dependency: Isle of Man
- Post town: ISLE OF MAN
- Dialling code: 01624
- Police: Isle of Man
- Fire: Isle of Man
- Ambulance: Isle of Man

Ballure is a small hamlet about 0.75 mile southeast of Ramsey on the Isle of Man. A stop on the Manx Electric Railway which runs through it is the Ballure Halt (or Ballure Glen) station. The latter lies just to the south of the boundary of Ramsey, and thus lies in the ward (and traditional parish) of Maughold within the current administrative parish (and traditional sheading) of Garff.

== Legend ==
Arthur William Moore reported that there was a sighting of the glashtin or Cabbyl-Ushtey, a water-horse of Manx legend at Ballure Glen in 1859.
