= Maughold =

5th-century saint

Saint Maughold
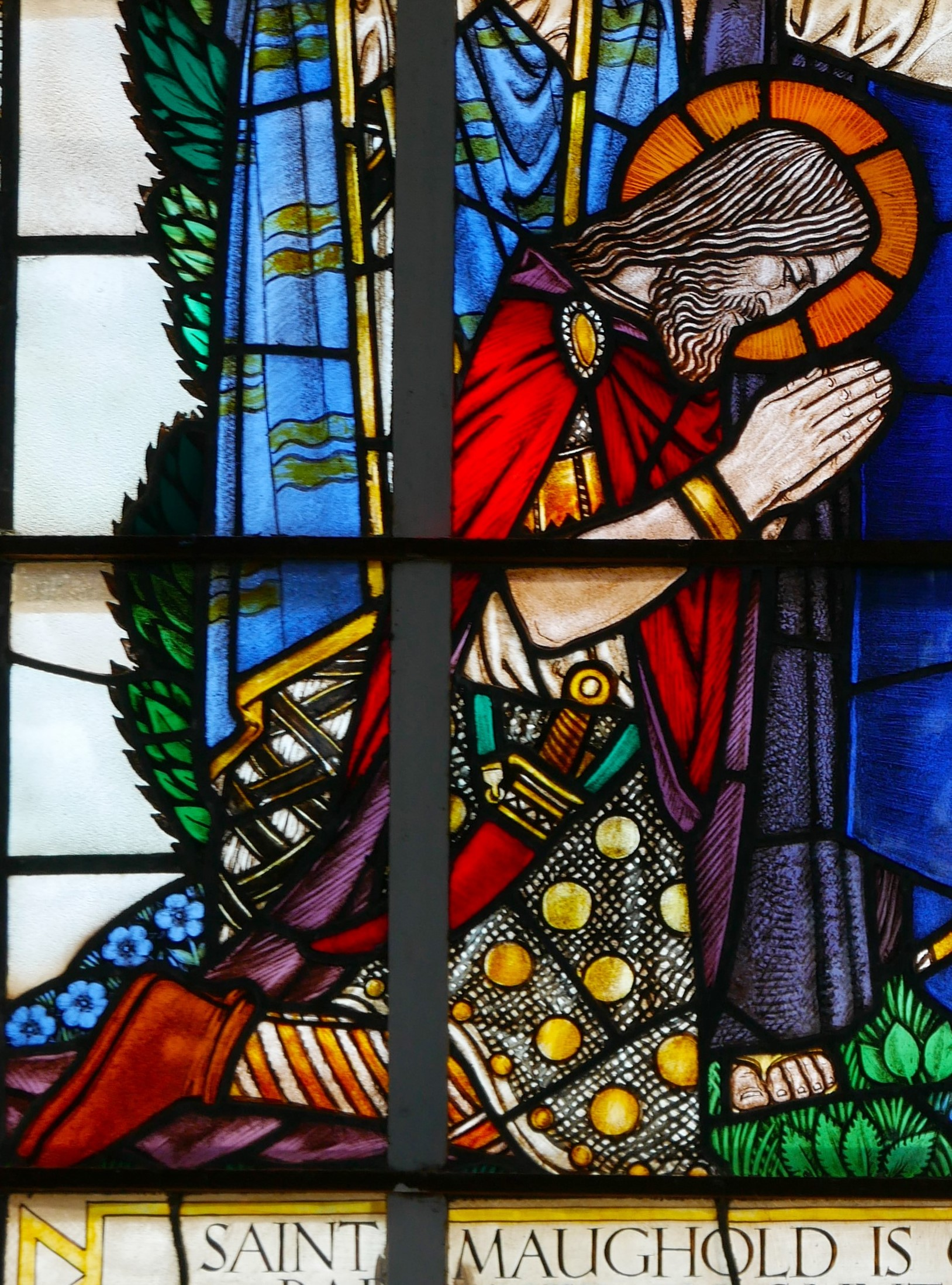
- Saint Maughold (detail from a stained glass window at Jurby)
- Died: c. 488
- Venerated in: Roman Catholic Church; Eastern Orthodox Church
- Feast: 25 April (formerly 28 December), Anglican feast day 31 July
- Patronage: Isle of Man

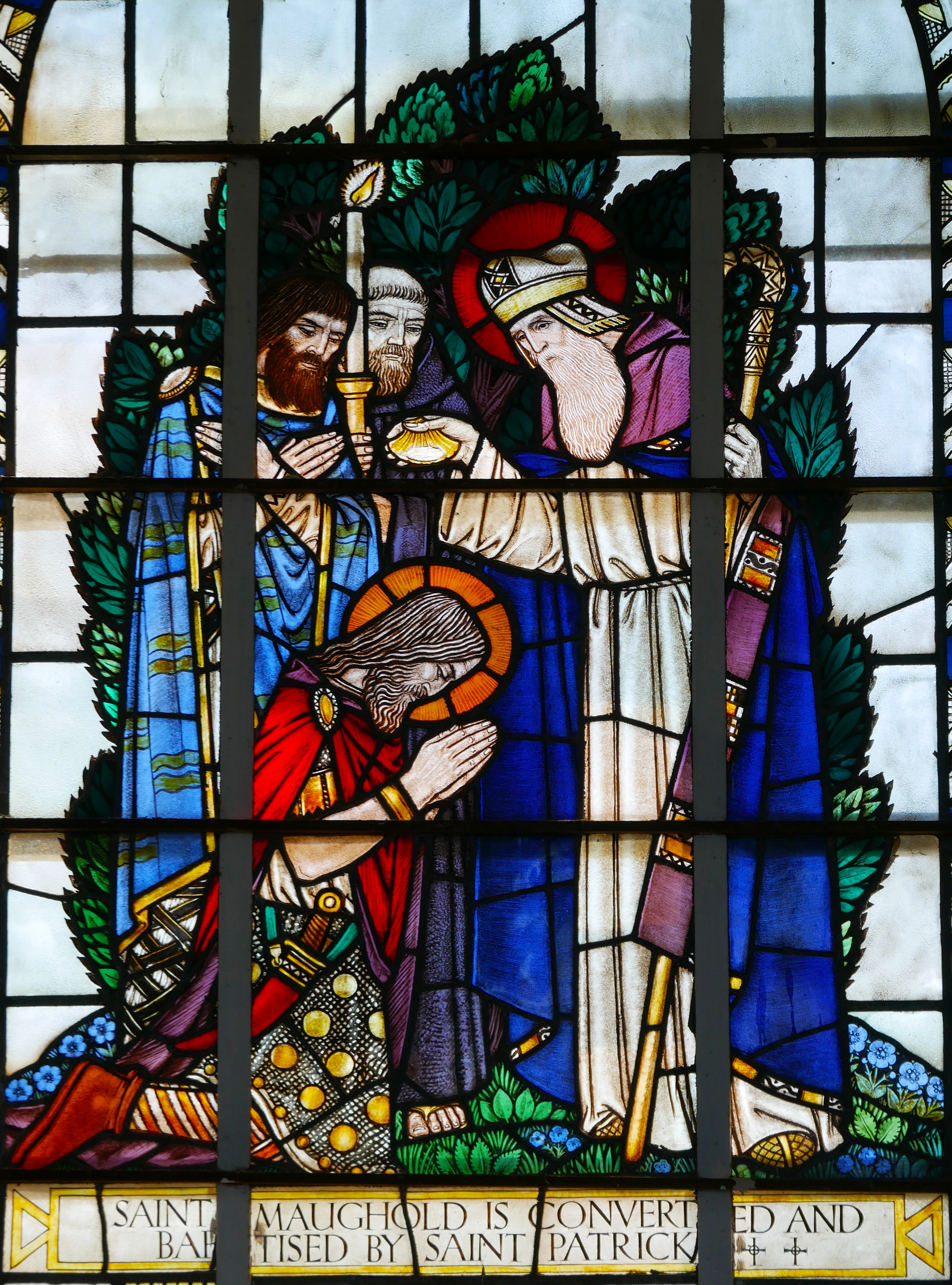
Stained glass window at Jurby depicting Saint Patrick baptising Maughold

Maughold (also known as Macaille, Maccaldus, Machalus, Machaoi, Machella, Maghor, Mawgan, Maccul, Macc Cuill; died c. 488 AD) is venerated as the patron saint of the Isle of Man. Tradition states that he was an Irish prince and captain of a band of freebooters who was converted to Christianity by Saint Patrick. His feast day is 25 April. His original name is unclear, but was probably adapted from Bishop MacCaille of Croghan, County Offaly, who received Brigit of Kildare into religious life

== Legend ==
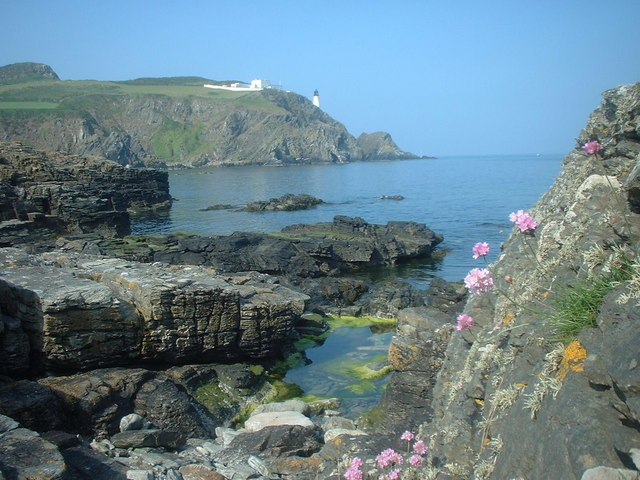
Maughold head

One local legend relates that Maughold tried to make a fool out of Patrick. Maughold had, according to this story, placed a living man in a shroud. He then called for Patrick to try to revive the allegedly dead man. Patrick came, placed a hand on the shroud, and left. When Maughold and his friends opened the shroud, they found the man had died in the interim. One of Maughold's friends, a fellow named Connor, went over to Patrick's camp and apologized to him. Patrick returned and baptized all of the men assembled. He then blessed the man who had died, who immediately returned to life, and was also baptized. Patrick then criticized Maughold, saying he should have been helping his men to lead good lives, and told him he must make up for his evil.

As penance for his previous crimes, Patrick ordered him to abandon himself to the Christian God by sailing from Ireland in a currach without oars. Maughold drifted to the isle, where two of Patrick's disciples, Romulus and Conindrus (Romuil and Conindri), were already established. Tradition says he landed on the northeast corner of the Isle near Ramsey, at the foot of a headland since called Maughold Head, where he established himself as a hermit in a cave on the mountainside. He is said to have been chosen by the Manx people to succeed Romuil and Conindri as bishop.

Maughold is today best remembered on the Isle of Man for his kind disposition toward the Manx natives. Several places on the island, including, Maughold parish, St Maughold's Well, and St Maughold's Chair are named after him.
