= The Michael Players =

Manx dialect theatre performance group in the Isle of Man

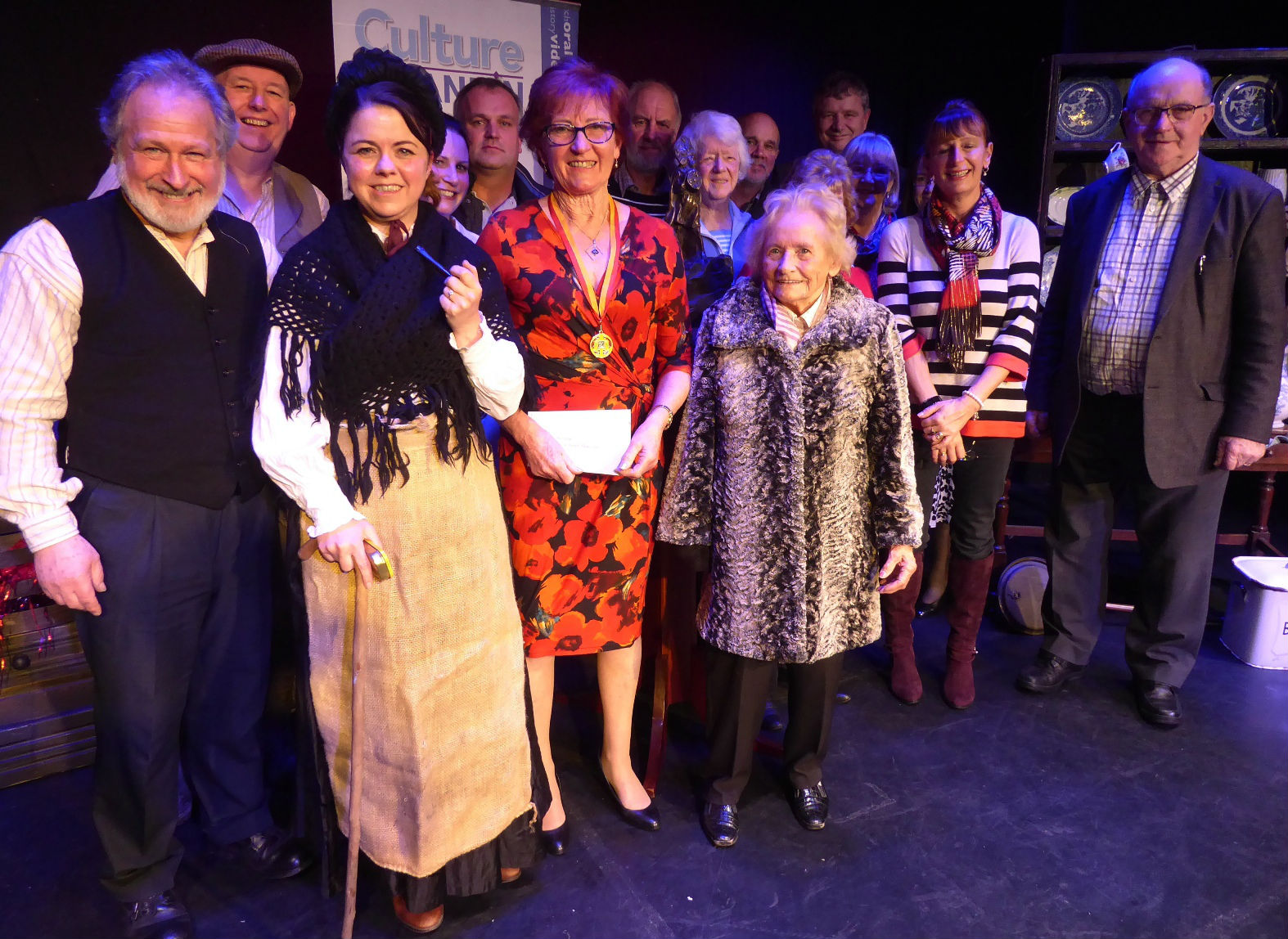
Members of The Michael Players receive the RBV award in 2017.

The Michael Players RBV are the oldest existing body of performers of Manx dialect theatre in the Isle of Man. They are centrally important to the continued tradition of Manx dialect theatre, both through their performances and in their unique collection of Manx plays.

== History ==
Although it is not known when the Michael Players were first formed, a group in Kirk Michael were performing Manx dialect plays or sketches at least as early as the 1930s. A group were performing again after the war by 1948, but the Michael Players made their first full "revived" performance in 1954. This performance was organised by Miss Mary Cannell as an entertainment for the Manx branch of the Celtic Congress in Michael School following a tour of Bishopscourt. Cannell instituted the annual "Oie'll Verree" entertainment finishing in the Michael Players' performance of a Manx dialect play. The Players were produced for many years by Miss Mary Cannell and Mrs Edna Cooil. In more recent years, the Players have been produced by Winnie Callister, until her retirement from the group in 2014, followed by Roy Kennaugh, until his death at the end of 2017.

The Michael Players today continue the tradition of giving an annual performance of Manx dialect theatre at an Oie'll Verree event, held on Old Christmas Eve in early January. The event is now organised by the Michael Heritage Trust and held at the Ebenezer Hall in Kirk Michael. The event is very popular and tickets consistently sell out long in advance of the evening. As supporters of the event, revenue from the ticket sales for these events has gone to the Michael Heritage Trust since the year 2000, but proceeds previously went to the Celtic Congress. The Michael Players are the only established group performing works from the Manx dialect theatre tradition in the Isle of Man today.

In 2017 the Michael Players were awarded the Reih Bleeaney Vanannan, the Isle of Man's greatest annual cultural award for contributions to Manx culture. It was awarded to the Players in recognition of "over 60 years of community cultural contribution [...] in presenting, preserving and promoting Manx dialect theatre." The value of the work of the Players was alluded to in a statement issued by the organisers of the award:

"The plays of Cushag, Christopher Shimmin, Mona Douglas, Kathleen Faragher and many more make up a unique tradition which could easily have been lost if it had not been for successive generations of enthusiasts with a strong sense of community and a desire to share and celebrate Manx culture."

== The Michael Players' Collection ==
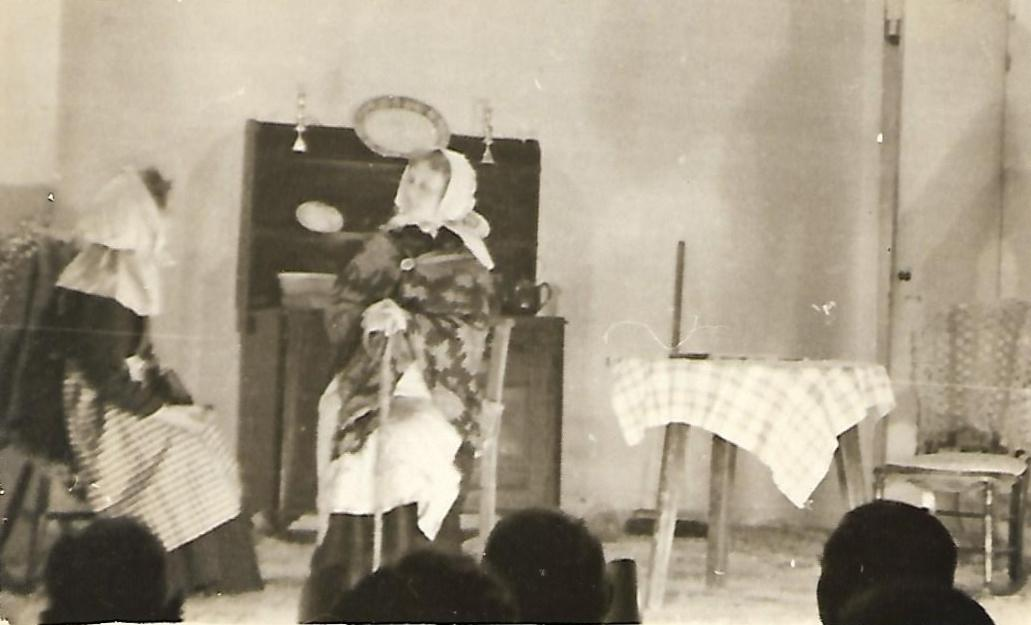
An early picture of a performance by The Michael Players

Over the course of their existence, the Michael Players have come to collect an important and unique collection of Manx dialect theatre. As many as 50 plays have been identified as of significant importance to Manx literature, and many are not known to exist anywhere else. Many of these are in the original manuscript form, or else bear unique annotations by the authors. Writers whose plays are represented include: Kathleen Faragher, Mona Douglas, Christopher R. Shimmin, J. J. Kneen, Juan Noa, P. W. Caine and W. B. Meyrick. The collection of plays has been estimated as being of great importance for Manx literature:

"The Michael Players [...] store of Manx dialect play and sketch manuscripts is the most important resource of its kind anywhere in the world and it contains unique copies of plays which would be otherwise entirely lost today."

In June 2016 a project funded by Culture Vannin was launched to transcribe these plays and make them freely available on line. An initial release of plays by J. J. Kneen was followed in December 2016 with a number of plays by Christopher Shimmin. It is hoped that the full collection of plays will eventually be made available.

== Performances ==
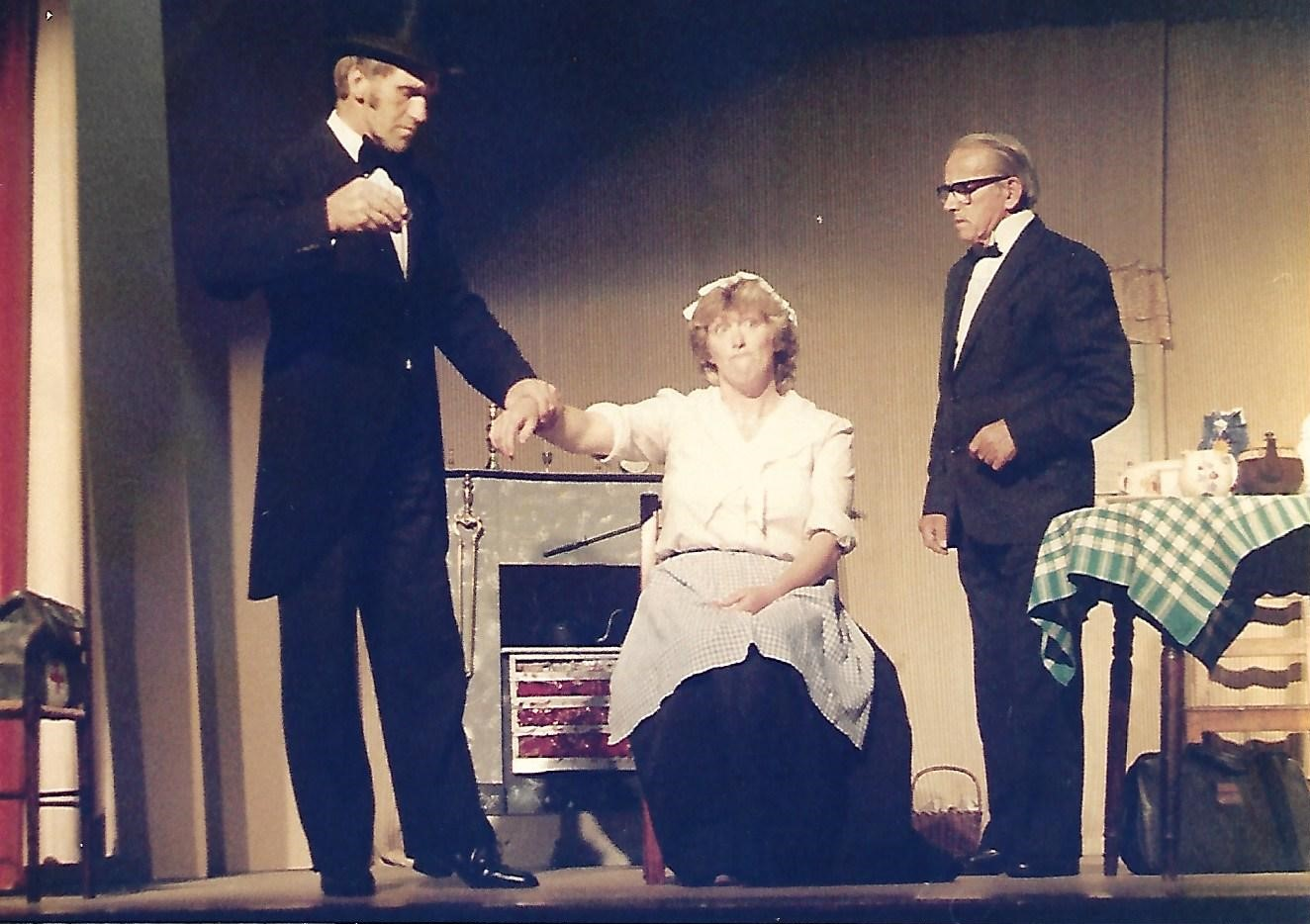
The Michael Players perform The Dumb Cake in 1987

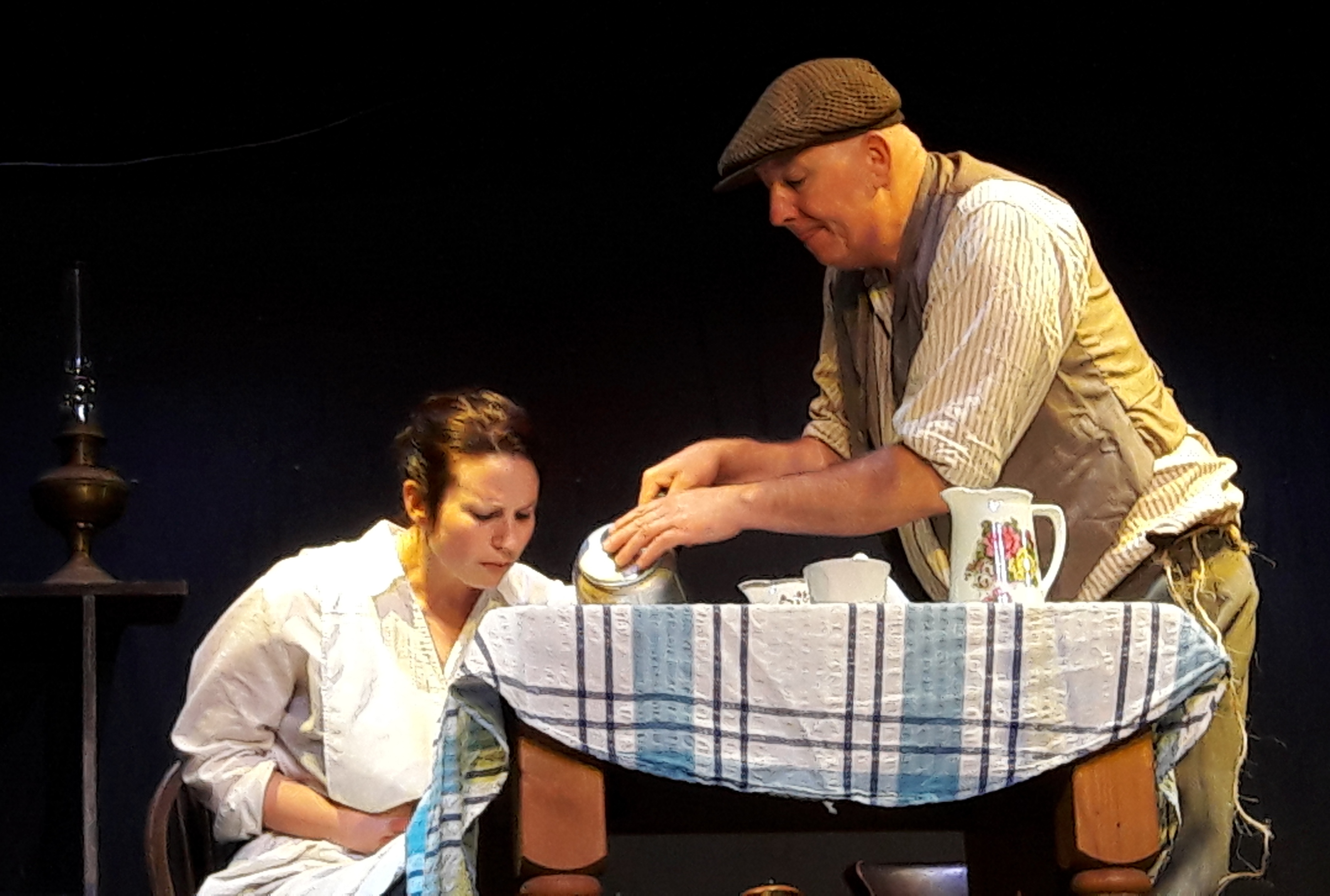
The Michael Players perform The Charm in 2017

Although the Michael Players have been performing for over 60 years, there are few records of the plays performed within each year. The known performances are as follows:

- 2020: Mr. Quilliam Decides by Lillian and Eva Kneen
- 2019: In the Doctor's Waiting Room by J, E, Q, Cooil
- 2018: A Lil Smook by J. J. Kneen
- 2017: The Charm by Christopher R. Shimmin
- 2016: A Cat and Dog Life by Kathleen Faragher
- 2015: A Trip in a Double Decker by Eva Kneen and Buggane Bait by J. E. Q. Cooil
- 2014: The Dumb Cake by Lillian and Eva Kneen
- 2013: The Charm by Christopher R. Shimmin
- 2011: Yn Blaa Sooree by J. J. Kneen
- 2010: Courtin' Times
- 2009: A Lil Smook by J. J. Kneen
- 2008: Jus the Shy by Eva Kneen
- 1996: Yn Blaa Sooree by J. J. Kneen
- 1991: Mr Quilliam Decides by Lillian and Eva Kneen
- 1987: The Dumb Cake by Lillian and Eva Kneen
- 1985: The Charm by Christopher R. Shimmin
- 1961: The Dumb Cake by Lilliam and Eva Kneen
- 1956 (March): The Club Day by Christopher R. Shimmin
- 1956 (January): The Raformah by Juan Noa and Up for the Guild by Eva Kneen
- 1954: The Charm by Christopher R. Shimmin
