= The Peel Players =

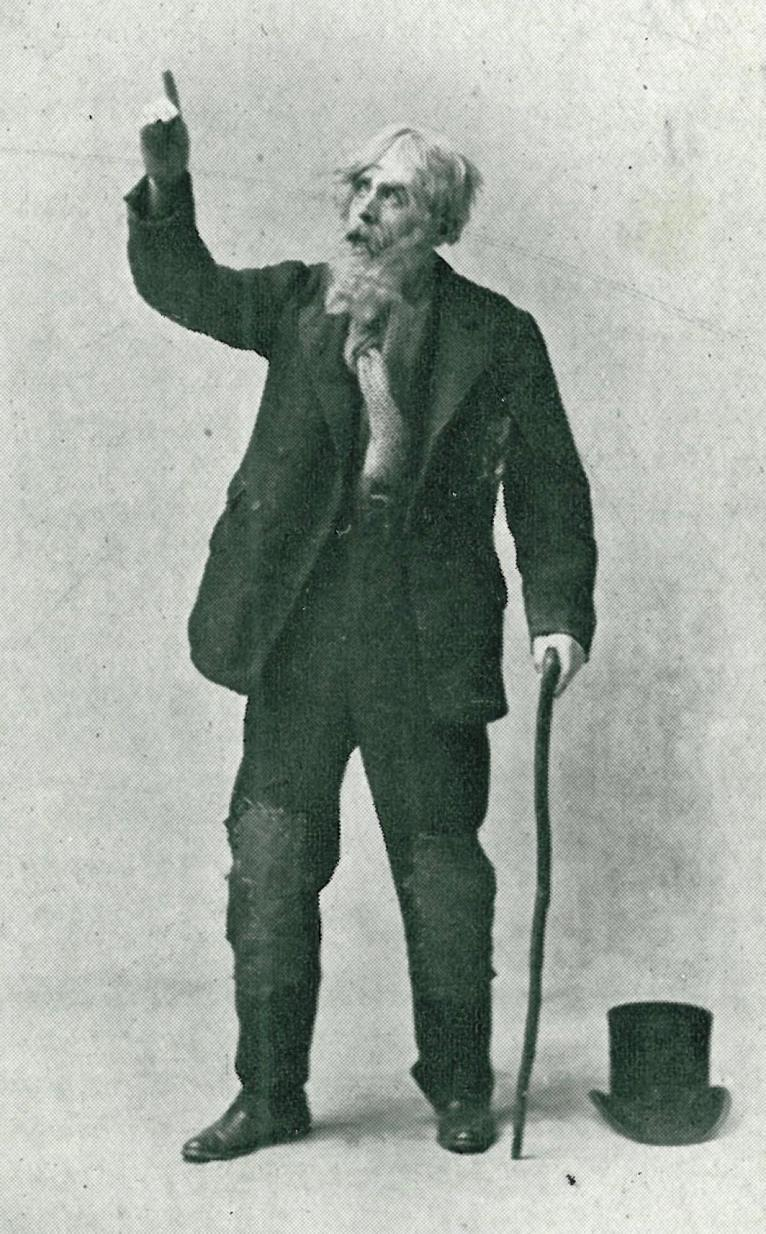
W. B. Meyrick as 'Chalse' in the 1913 production of Illiam Kodhere's Will

The Peel Players were an amateur theatre group from the Isle of Man in operation during the 1910s and specialising in Anglo-Manx dialect productions.

Through the initiation of Sophia Morrison, the group met for the first time in July 1912 at Christian Street School, Peel. They commenced playing in 1913 with Christopher R. Shimmin as producer.

On 13 January 1913 the Players premiered Shimmin's short Manx dialect play, Illiam Kodhere's Will, in the Gaiety Theatre in Douglas. The Players then took their production of this and another of Shimmin's plays, The Charm, to the David Lewis' Theatre in Liverpool. It was reported of this performance (by Sophia Morrison) that "There was a crowded house. The Liverpool newspapers gave unstinted praise to both plays and players." In the winter of that same year, the Players did a production of Shimmin's next plays, Luss ny Graih and The Dooinney Moyllee.

The Players were keen to use the profits from their performances for charitable purposes in line with their Manx ideals. This included a donation of £52 in 1913 to The Manx Society, for "the publication of Manx books and music, music prizes, and so forth," at a time when the Society was in desperate need of money, and a donation in 1915 to help fund the provision of copies of T. E. Brown's poems for all schools on the island.

When World War I broke out, Mannin reported that: "The Peel Players' revenue had been devoted to war objects, so that their work had been somewhat curtailed for lack of funds." This continued for the following year, when Mannin reported that the Players:

"have this season given their profits to war funds, or for gifts to Peel men on active service and in training; £10 went to Douglas Needlework Fund, £10 to Douglas Belgian Hostel, £5 8s. to Ramsey Belgian Hostel, and the rest to Peel men serving on sea or land."

It was only two years after this, in January 1917, that Sophia Morrison, the inspiration behind the Players, died. The central connection between Morrison and the Players was demonstrated by some of their members forming her pallbearers: John J. Joughin, Christopher R. Shimmin, C. Cashin and C. H. Cowley. The Peel Players did not last long beyond this time.

People who acted with the Peel Players include: Christopher R. Shimmin, William B. Meyrick, John J. Joughin, Evelyn Christian, Amy Preston, C. Cashin, C. H. Cowley, W. H. Crellin, John W. Kelly, Hilda Vick, Amelia Keegan, Lionel Lucas, Charles W. Palmer, Tom Dodd, Sam Harrison and Annie V. Cain.

Although the Peel Players were only a small amateur group, they are perhaps the most significant theatre group in modern Manx history. Through their central place in the Manx Cultural Revival and their premiering works by perhaps the island's most important playwright, in Christopher R. Shimmin, the Peel Players have been compared to the Abbey Theatre in Dublin for their significance to Manx culture.

== Plays produced ==
- Illiam Kodhere's Will by Christopher R. Shimmin
- The Charm by Christopher R. Shimmin
- Luss by Graih by Christopher R. Shimmin
- The Dooinney Moyllee by Christopher R. Shimmin

It had also been hoped that the Players could stage productions of Catchin Kirree by F. Corris and Ellie's Stranger by W. Clucas Kinley, but the onset of the First World War disrupted these plans.
