= Dolland =

Dolland may refer to:

- Dolland Halt, railway halt on the Isle of Man
- misspelling of Dollond, surname of opticians

== See also ==
- Dollands Moor Freight Yard, railway yard in Kent, England
