= The Charm (play) =

Play by Christopher R. Shimmin

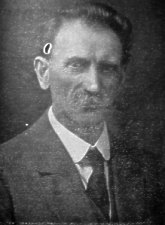
Christopher Shimmin, author of The Charm

The Charm is a comic one-act Manx dialect play by Christopher R. Shimmin. It was first performed in 1912 by the Peel Players and it is considered to be one of the earliest and most frequently performed pieces in the Manx dialect repertoire.

== Background ==
From 1908 Sophia Morrison had been producing Manx dialect theatre at Manx Language Society entertainments in Peel. These had been written by Cushag and John Quine initially, but in 1912 Sophia Morrison commissioned Christopher Shimmin to write the plays. Morrison plotted out the action of The Charm and Shimmin wrote it, before it was rehearsed in her home on Athol Street, Peel. When it was produced in November 1912, it was a new venture for the Manx Language Society, in that it was their first event consisting solely of plays, without other items on the stage.

== Plot ==
Jem and Kirrie Quilliam are unhappily married due to his unreasonable expectations of her. Kirrie mentions this to Pyee, a travelling beggar woman and dealer in charms, who suggests that she might be able to offer a solution. Kirrie follows her direction and puts a herb into Jem's tea, which brings them both to fall into a deep sleep. When they awake their roles are reversed, with Kirree asking unreasonable levels of work from Jem. Pyee returns and this time Jem asks for a herb to remedy the situation, which she provides. After another sleep, the couple awake happily in love again. The play closes with Kirree on Jem's knee.

== Early performances ==
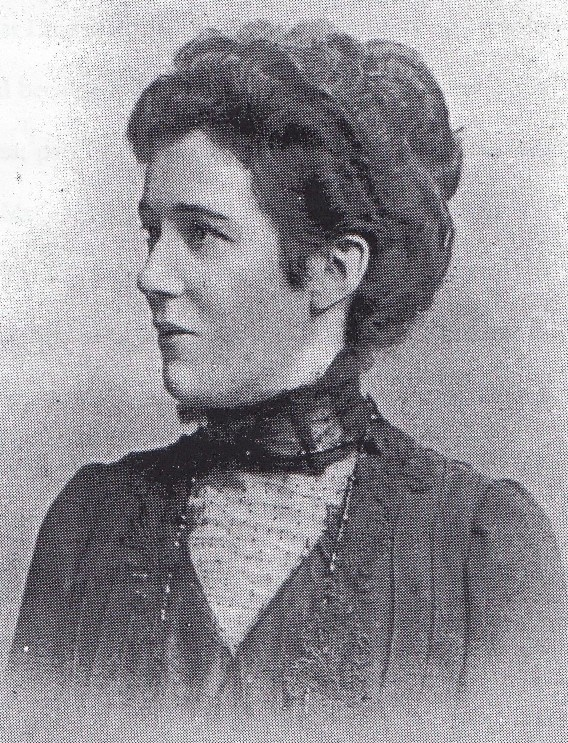
Sophia Morrison, producer of the first production of The Charm

The play was first performed in the Centenary Hall in Peel on 7 November 1912, alongside Illiam Kodhere's Will, also by Christopher Shimmin. The event was organised by Sophia Morrison in aid of the Manx Language Society. The hall was "packed" and the plays receiving an "enthusiastic reception", with The Charm being said to have "caused great laughter, from start to finish". In the curtain call that followed the performance, Shimmin took to the stage and delivered a short speech. In this he emphasised the specifically Manx element of the production, which was important to the building of Manx identity underway at that time:

Mr. Shimmin thanked the audience for their kind reception. He was a Manxman, and that was one of the few things he had to be proud of. There was one point he was very pleased of – the promoters, the players, Miss Morrison, and himself, were all Manx.

The actors involved in the production were: Tom Dodd, Annie V. Caine, John J. Joughin and Amelia Keegan. Under Sophia Morrion's direction, they took on the name of The Peel Players ahead of their repeat performances. After a performance in Ramsey, the plays were produced at the Gaiety Theatre in Douglas in January 1913—a performance referred to as "a complete success". This performance had the distinction of attracting the Lieutenant Governor of the Isle of Man, Lord Raglan, to attend.

The Peel Players then took their production of Shimmin's plays to the David Lewis' Theatre in Liverpool for the Liverpool Manx Society, where it was reported (by Sophia Morrison) that "There was a crowded house. The Liverpool newspapers gave unstinted praise to both plays and players."

Prior to this, in January 1913, the play had been published by the Manx Language Society.

== Later productions ==
The Charm has remained a popular play to be performed for over 100 years. It has been performed a number of times by The Michael Players, the longest standing group of performers of Manx dialect theatre. Their most recent production was in January 2017.
