= Thomas Dodd =

Thomas or Tom Dodd may refer to:

- Thomas J. Dodd (1907–1971), United States Senator and Representative from Connecticut
- Thomas J. Dodd Jr. (born 1935), former United States Ambassador to Uruguay and to Costa Rica
- Thomas Dodd (printseller) (1771–1850), English auctioneer and printseller
- Thomas Dodd (artist) (born 1961), visual artist and photographer from Atlanta, Georgia
- Tom Dodd (baseball) (born 1958), American baseball player
- Tom Dodd (rugby union) (born 1997), Scottish rugby union player
- Tom Dodd (actor) (1883–1963), Manx dialect performer
