= Juan Noa =

Juan Noa was the pen-name of John Henry Cleator, a Manx dialect poet and playwright active from the 1920s to the 1960s in the Isle of Man.

== Life ==
Cleator ran the family drapery business, located at 24 Parliament Street, Ramsey. He was married, to Hilda Vondy, and lived at Claughbane. He was a member of the Guild Committee and served on the Ramsey Commissioners for many years. After his retirement, Cleator made frequent trips to visit family in Chicago. It was whilst in America in December 1962 that he fell ill. He returned by air to the Isle of Man and was transferred on a stretcher from the aeroplane to Noble's Hospital where he died three weeks later on 2 January 1963.

== Poetry ==
Cleator’s first published poem, 'A Story that's Thrue of a Moddey Dhoo,' appeared in the Ramsey Courier in May 1927 when it appeared under the pen-name of 'Juan Thubm Billy-yn-Clayragh Jonnie.' This and his next poem, 'The Big Buggane', both of which were later to appear in Manx Yarns, were described in the Manx press as being ‘distinctly spirited, true to the Manx character and the incidents of Manx country life’ noting that Cleator was ‘a Manx dialect writer of decided talent.’ Also in 1927, Cleator started to enter the Yn Chruinnaght competitions, winning the award for the best story in Manx dialect in that year. After successes in Manx dialect classes at Yn Chruinnaght and in performances of his poems, Manx Yarns was published in December 1930. A newspaper report described the publication in the following terms:

A delightful book of "Manx Yarns," in verse, breathing the very atmosphere of Manx country life, has just been published from the offices of this paper. The author chooses to hide his identity under the name of "Juan Noa," but many of his friends will recognise his "yarns" as some of the most popular concert items of recent years and it is at the request of these friends that he has had them published. Two of them were recited by Mr Leighton Stowell at Ramsey’s welcome to the Homecomers, and "brought down the house."

Over 30 years later, it was said that the poems of this collection had been 'recited in every village in the Island. No Manx concert would be complete without one of John Cleator’s poems.'

The book originally featured 16 poems, but ‘Isle of Our Fathers’ was also added in reprints made after December 1942. The collection was Cleator’s only published collection of poetry and it features all of his best-known works, including 'Owl Bobby Bob', 'Betsy Juan-y-Voallyah' and 'The Spoot-Vane Moddey-Dhoo'. These poems remain popular pieces for performances at Manx events today, with a recent performance by Bob Carswell being recorded at Maughold in 2014. Cleator's poems also feature on numerous CDs of Manx dialect recordings, notably Mostly T. E. Brown by Laurence Kermode, which features readings of five of Cleator's poems. In contemporary popular Manx culture, the first line of Cleator’s poem, 'Owl' Bobby Bob', features as the refrain of the Claare ny Geal programme on Manx Radio.

== Theatre ==
Cleator's poetry was frequently performed at gatherings on the Isle of Man alongside other forms of Manx entertainment. Although he was to perform alongside other poets such as Kathleen Faragher, his closest relationship as a performer was with Leighton Stowell, as a reciter, a performer, actor and as a leader of Manx dancers.

Cleator wrote a number of plays, the most popular of which was The Raformah. The play's first appearance came at the 1930 Yn Chruinnaght, where it won the gold medal. It went on to be performed around the Isle of Man and beyond, including at Ramsey, Douglas, Peel, Liverpool and London. It was after the 1937 performance of the Ramsey Players in Liverpool (with Leighton Stowell in the role as Tom Keolyah) that the press noted that:

The Raformah is, perhaps, the best known and one of the most popular of all Manx plays, and, no matter how often it is presented, people who have seen it before seem to find fresh pleasure in the performance each time.

The play was published in book form in December 1945, it is the only play of Cleator's to have been published.

Cleator's next play was The Evil One produced in 1938, with Cleator himself taking one of the roles. This was followed by The Phynnodderies, first performed by the London Manx Society in London in 1946.

Cleator continued to write Manx dialect theatre into the 1960s, close to the end of his life. A letter to Leighton Stowell in 1960 reveals that at least two new three-act plays on Manx historical themes were finished at that time. These later plays are unpublished and their whereabouts is unknown.

== Works ==
- Manx Yarns (1930)
- The Raformah (1945)
- The Evil One (Unpublished. First performed, March 1938)
- The Phynnodderies (Unpublished. First performance, February 1946)
