= Tom Dodd (actor) =

Manx dialect performer (1883–1963)

- Born: Thomas Dodd; 1883; Douglas
- Died: 1963 (aged 79–80); Peel
- Known for: Member of the Peel Players; Manx language

Thomas Dodd (1883–1963) was a Manx dialect performer, a member of The Peel Players and a student of the Manx language.

== Personal life ==
Tom Dodd was born in Douglas, where he attended Douglas Grammar School. He spent his whole professional career with the Isle of Man Bank, eventually as the manager of the Peel branch. He retired due to ill health in 1929 after 35 years of service. Dodd also played a prominent role in Peel social circles as he was member of the Peel Ward Library Committee for over 40 years, chairman of the Peel Golf Club, and the Peel Board of Guardians.

== The Peel Players ==
Tom Dodd was a founding member of the Peel Players, who performed from 1912 until the death of Sophia Morrison in 1917. During that time, Dodd performed in at least three plays by Christopher R. Shimmin: The Charm, Illiam Kodhere’s Will, and Dooinney Moyllee. It was through these performances that the Peel Players came to be regarded today as possibly the most significant Manx dialect theatre company in Manx history.

== Manx language ==
Dodd was said to be interested in 'anything Manx', and he came to be an eager learner of the Manx language by the time he went to live in Peel. He attended Manx language classes at the Harbour Master's office in Peel, along with other prominent members of the Manx revival such as Leslie Quirk and Lewis Crellin. He became an influential member of the language community, particularly through his work to expand the written materials available to learners, which were limited at that time to the Manx Bible and Edmund Goodwin's First Lessons in Manx. Dodd and other Manx language students helped to promote the language by organising events such as Manx language church services and readings.

In April and May 1948, Dodd was one of the Manx people recorded by the Irish Folklore Commission. This was instigated by Éamon de Valera, in order to preserve a record of the Manx language, dialect and accent as it was spoken at that time. Dodd's inclusion in their recordings can be seen as a recognition of his significance to Manx culture.

== Bibliography ==
- Skeealyn Vannin / Stories of Mann: The complete collection of Manx Language archive recordings made by the Irish Folklore Commission in 1948, Douglas: Manx National Heritage, 2003, p. 15
