= Corkill's Crossing =

Railway station in Isle of Man, the UK

Corkill's Crossing Crossag Corkill
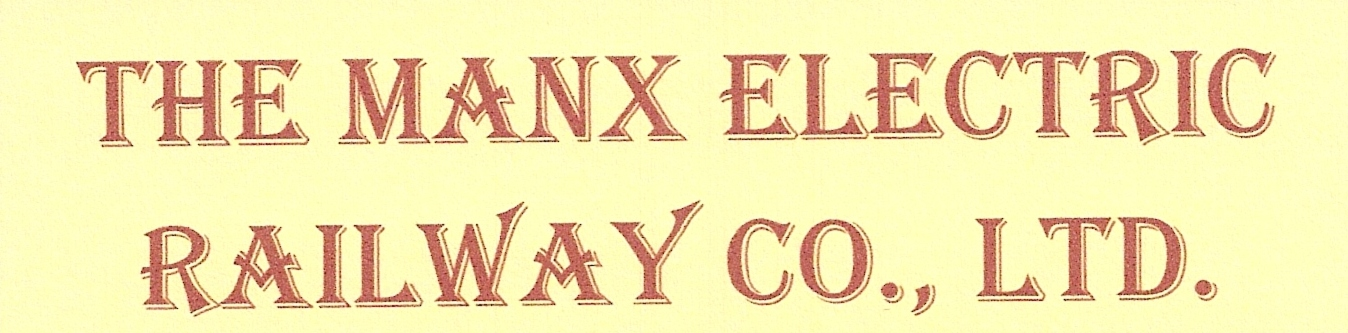

General information
- Location: Maughold, Isle Of Man
- Coordinates: 54°15′01″N 4°22′35″W
- Pole Nos.: 607-608
- System: Manx Electric Railway
- Owner: Isle Of Man Railways
- Platforms: Ground Level
- Tracks: Two Running Lines

Construction
- Structure type: None
- Parking: None

History
- Opened: 1911
- Former names: Manx Electric Railway Co.
Location

Corkill's Crossing (Manx: Crossag Corkhill) is an intermediate stopping place on the northerly section of the Manx Electric Railway on the Isle of Man.

== Location ==
This diminutive rural request stop caters almost exclusively for local traffic. Due to the nature of the tramway's construction, the cars can stop and drop off almost anywhere and will do so within reason. For this reason a great number of localised stopping places have built up since the line was completed, many at the intersection of farmer's crossings like this one. The crossings/halts usually take the name of the farmer or the farm as is the case here, but these unofficial halts never appear in timetable materials or have nameboards fitted to show their names.

== Notation ==
The stop has a bus stop-type totem sign attached to traction poles, and these were fitted in line with then-management policy in 1999. The halt passes the driveway of the private residence "Barony View"; the road which bisects it leads to the nearby Glen Mona Hotel & Country Pub.

== Route ==
Preceding station	Manx Electric Railway	Following station
Ballasholague towards Derby Castle	Douglas–Ramsey	Glen Mona towards Ramsey Station

== See also ==
- List of Manx Electric Railway stations
