= Glen Mona railway station =

Railway station in Isle of Man, the UK

Glen Mona Glion Shuin
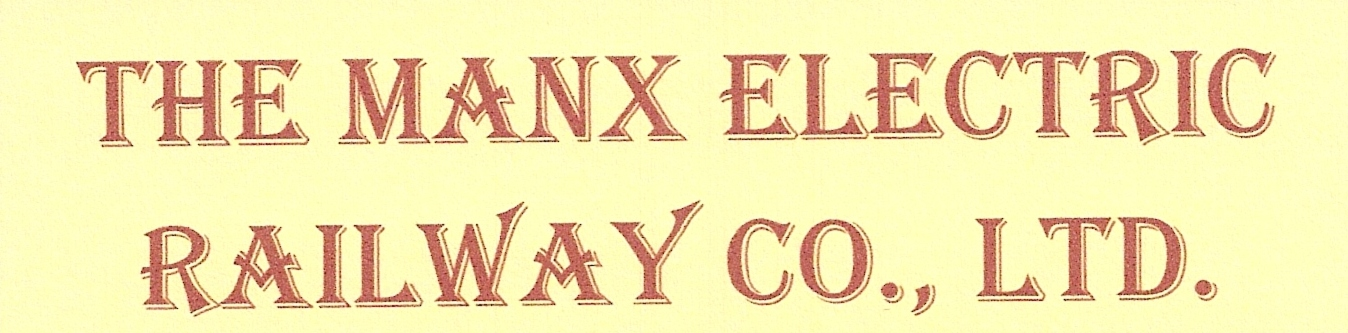

General information
- Location: Maughold, Isle Of Man
- Coordinates: 54°16′12″N 4°22′34″W
- Pole Nos.: 611-612
- System: Manx Electric Railway
- Owner: Isle Of Man Railways
- Platforms: Ground Level
- Tracks: Two Running Lines

Construction
- Structure type: Waiting Shelter
- Parking: None

History
- Opened: 1899
- Rebuilt: 1985
- Former names: Manx Electric Railway Co.
Location

Glen Mona Railway Station (Manx: Stashoon Raad Yiarn Ghlion Shuin) is an intermediate stopping place on the northerly section of the Manx Electric Railway on the Isle of Man.

== Location ==
The stop serves the nearby village of the same name which boasts its own filling station, public house and primitive chapel, known as "Ballagory" and is situated on the main road between Laxey and Ramsey on the Isle of Man. The station is a short distance from the main road to which the railway runs parallel for this section.

== Facilities ==
The stop has its own wooden waiting shelter, constructed in 1985 to replace the extant corrugated iron version.

== Route ==
Preceding station	Manx Electric Railway	Following station
Corkill's Crossing towards Derby Castle	Douglas–Ramsey	The Garey towards Ramsey Station

== Also ==
Manx Electric Railway Stations

== Sources ==
- Manx Electric Railway Stopping Places (2002) Manx Electric Railway Society
- Island Images: Manx Electric Railway Pages (2003) Jon Wornham
- Official Tourist Department Page (2009) Isle Of Man Heritage Railways
