= Glen Mona =

Human settlement in the Isle of Man

Coordinates: 54.2717918°N 4.3763323°W

Glen Mona: Manx: Glion Shuin
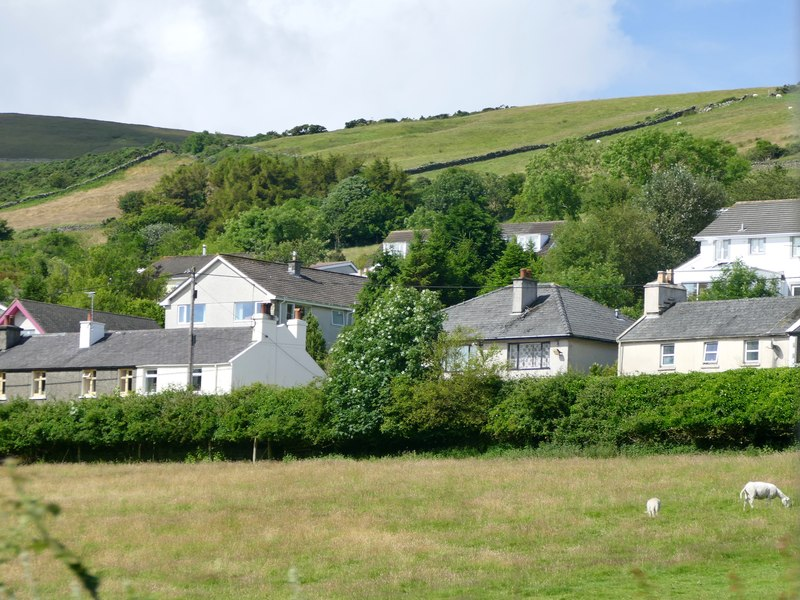
- Houses at Glen Mona

- Location within the Isle of Man
- Parish: Maughold
- Sheading: Garff
- Crown dependency: Isle of Man
- Postcode district: IM7
- Police: Isle of Man
- Fire: Isle of Man
- Ambulance: Isle of Man

Glen Mona (Manx: Glion Shuin) is a small settlement in the parish of Maughold in the northeast of the Isle of Man. It is situated along the A2 and separated from Dhoon to the south by Barony Hill. Glen Mona Ford is a tributary of the Cornaa to the east.

== Toponymy ==
Glen Mona is a "modern name". It was historically called Glen Shone (Manx: Glion Shuin), meaning "rush glen".

== Religion ==
The confusingly named Christ Church, Dhoon (colloquially known as Dhoon Church) is located Glen Mona rather than the nearby Dhoon Glen. Designed by Ewan Christian and built for £730 after the previous Dhoon church fell into disrepair, the Anglican church was consecrated in 1855. In 1910, Reverend George W Gregson proposed building a hall and Sunday school. With limited funds, architect and part-time Maughold resident Bernard Brameld offered to design it free of charge in "Old English style". Dhoon Church Hall opened in 1912 and would serve as a community venue.

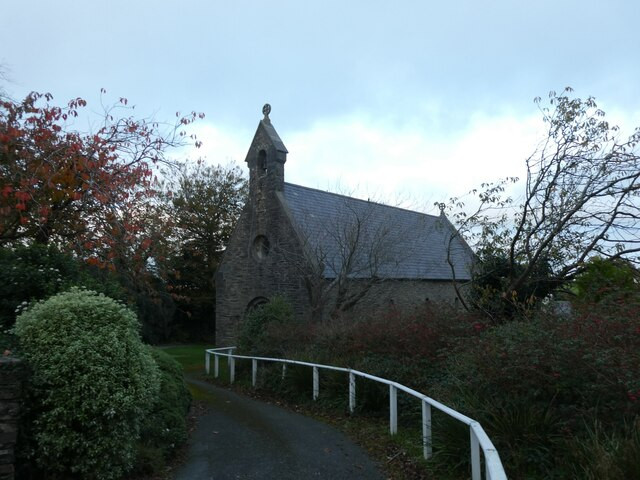
Christ Church, Dhoon

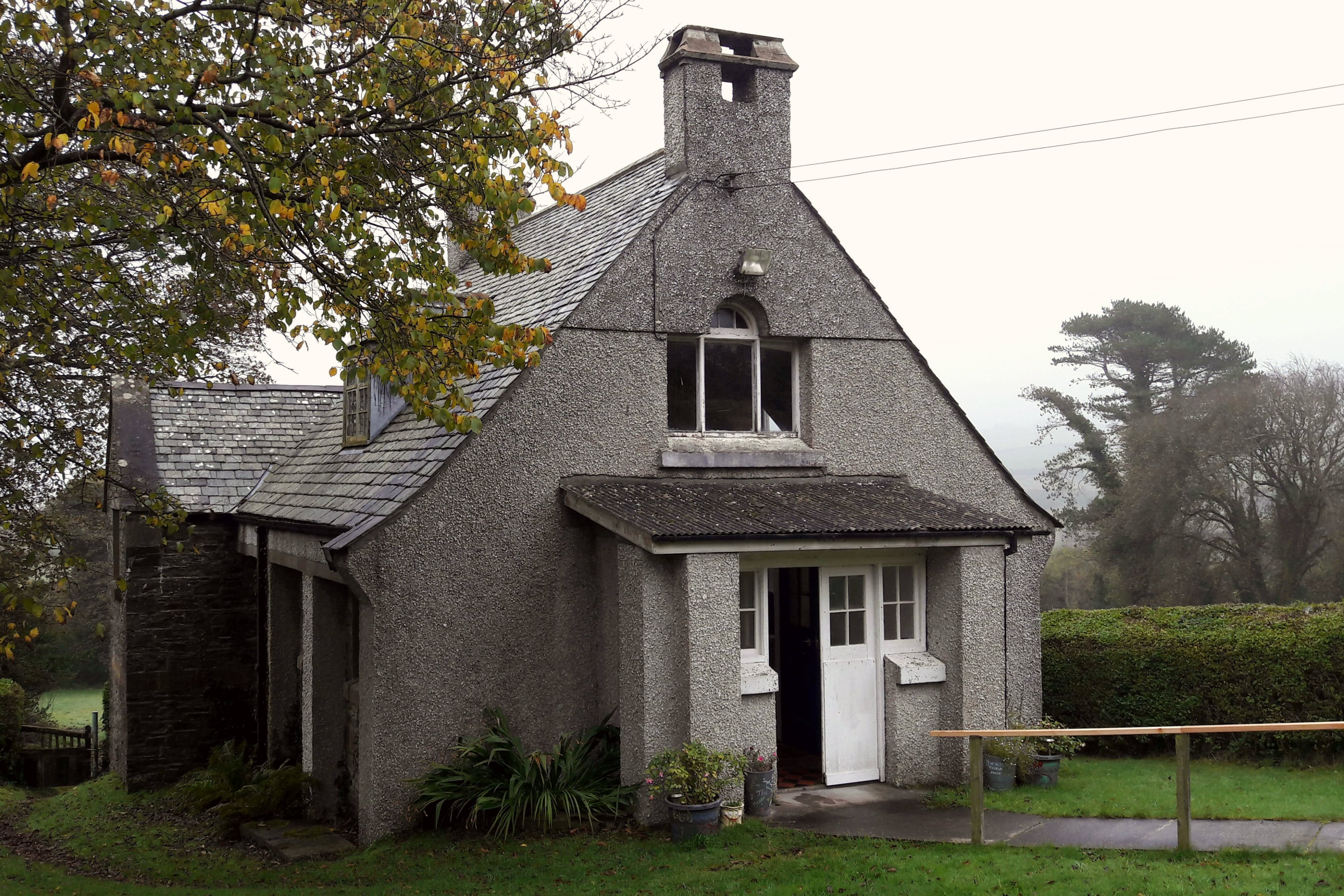
Dhoon Church Hall

Ballagorey Methodist Chapel was built in 1832 and rebuilt in 1866. The chapel fell into disuse in 1934. It is reportedly haunted by a glashtyn.

== Education ==
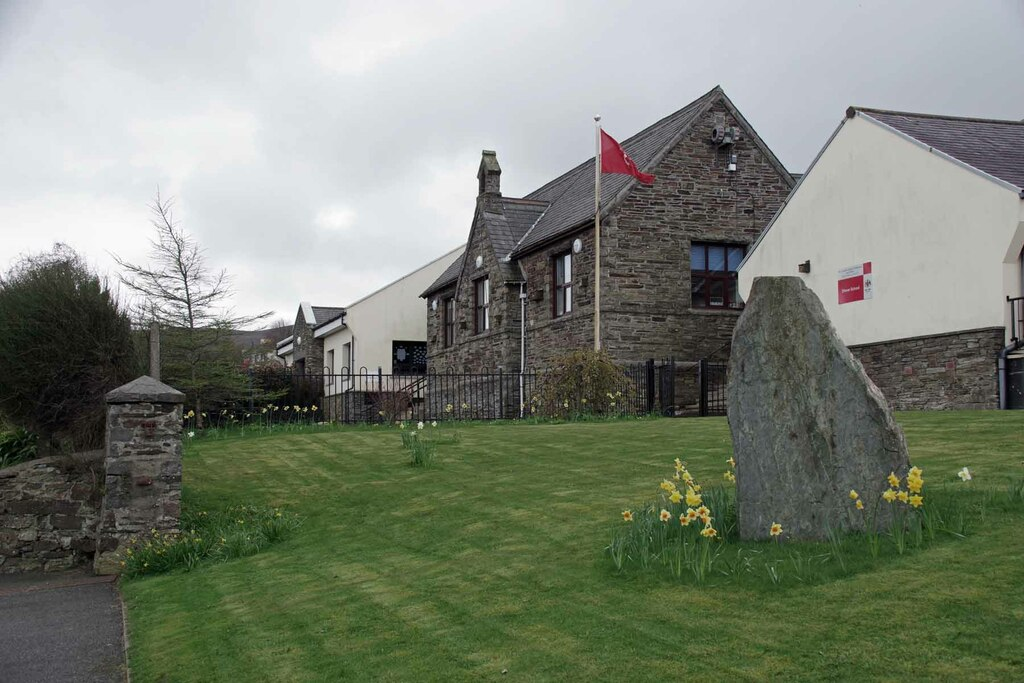
Dhoon School

Also confusingly named is Dhoon School, which opened in Glen Mona in 1876 and replaced the Dhoon Bridge and Lhaggan schools. The primary school has since undergone expansion and modernisation. In 2017, it was federated with Laxey School.

== Amenities ==
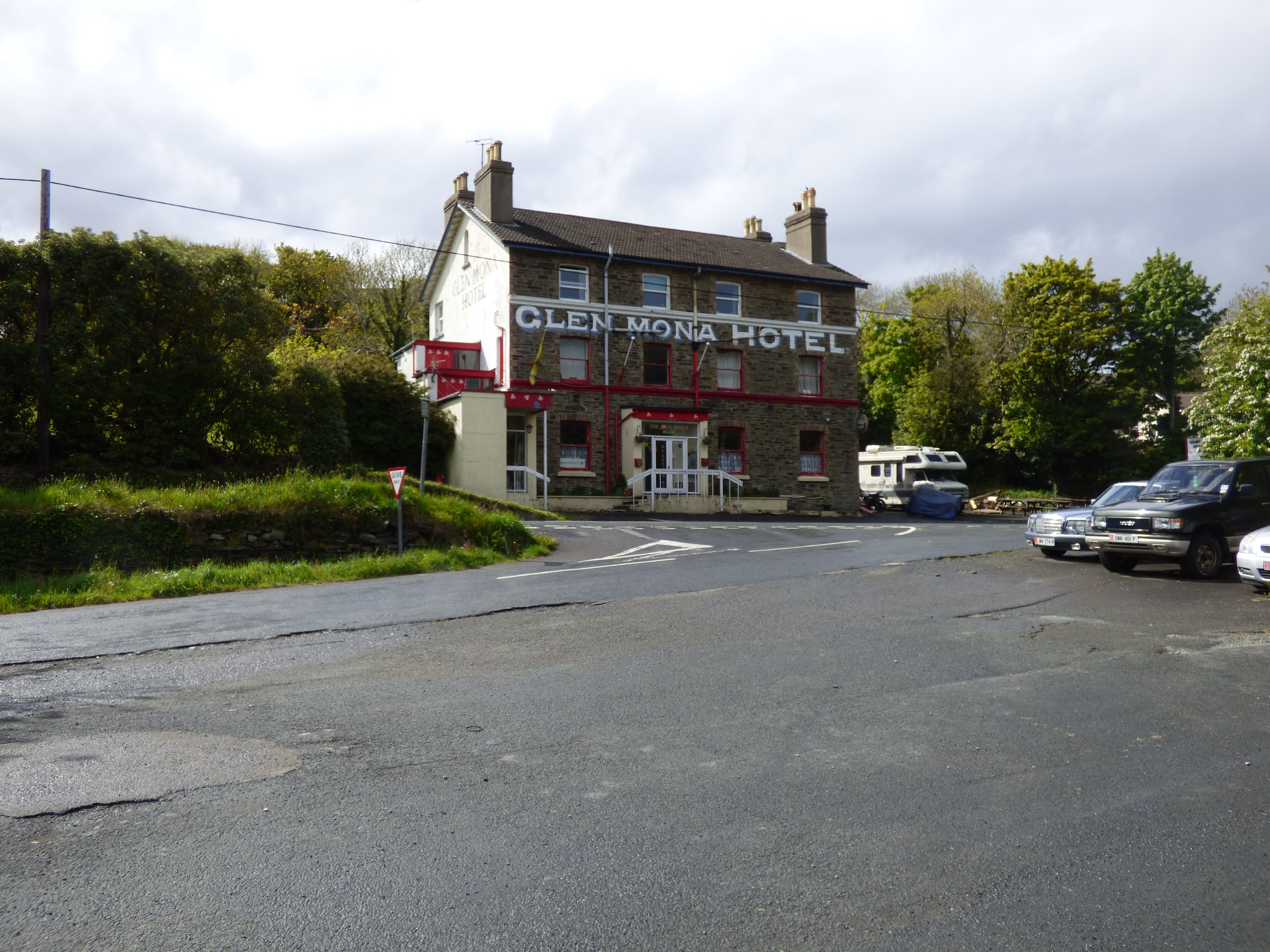
The Glen Mona

Glen Mona is the site of The Glen Mona hotel and public house. During the COVID-19 pandemic, it was temporarily converted into a convenience store for the local community.

== Transport ==
The village is served by Glen Mona railway station on the Manx Electric Railway, first opened in 1899.

== Notable people ==
- Kathleen Faragher (1904–1974), Manx-language writer, lived in Glen Mona
