= Dollond =

Dollond may refer to:

- Dollond (crater), lunar crater

== People with the surname Dollond ==
- John Dollond (1706–1761), English optician
- Peter Dollond (1731–1821), English optician, son of John
- George Dollond (1774–1852), English optician, nephew of Peter

== See also ==
- Dollond & Aitchison, British retail opticians founded 1750, absorbed by Boots Opticians 2009
