= Dolland Halt =

Railway stop in Isle of Man, the UK

Coordinates: 54.27922°N 4.36963°W

Dolland Dolland
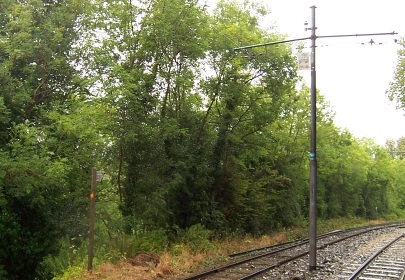

General information
- Location: Pole Nos. 643-644, Maughold, Isle Of Man
- System: Manx Electric Railway
- Owner: Isle Of Man Railways
- Line: Coast Line
- Platforms: Ground Level
- Tracks: Two Running Lines
- Connections: None (Pedestrian Only)

Construction
- Structure type: None
- Platform levels: Ground
- Parking: None

History
- Opened: August 1911 (Unofficial)
- Closed: Seasonally Since 1975
- Electrified: June 1899 (On Opening)
- Former names: Manx Electric Railway Co.
Location

Dolland Halt (Manx: Stadd Dolland) (more commonly, simply "Dolland" in unofficial timings) is a diminutive intermediate stopping place on the northern section of the Manx Electric Railway in the Isle of Man. Although unofficial it remains in use upon request.

== Location ==
Being a diminutive rural stop, this halt caters almost exclusively to local traffic. Due to the nature of the tramway's construction, the cars can stop and drop off almost anywhere and will do so within reason. For this reason a great number of localised stopping places have built up since the line was completed, many at the intersection of farmer's crossings like this one.

== Service ==
Although still used upon request, the station does not appear on any of the railway's official timetables, though timings can be ascertained by following the timings for the nearest two stopping places at Ballaglass Glen and Dhoon Glen both of which have allocated timings. Passengers may alight trams by informing the conductor, and board by flagging trams down.

== Naming ==
The crossings/halts usually take the name of the farmer or the farm as is the case here. Small stops such as this are largely unofficial and never appear in timetable materials or have nameboards fitted to show their names. Many do however now carry bus stop-type signs attached to traction poles, and these were fitted in line with then-management policy in 1999.

== Adoption ==
As part of a new initiative introduced in 2012 this stop, and the various others like it, were available under the Adopt A Station campaign covering both the electric line and the Isle of Man Railway in the south. Members of the public and volunteer groups are asked to come forward and tend to wayside stations, in a similar way to that already in place at Ballabeg Tram Station to the south.

== Route ==
| Preceding station | Manx Electric Railway | Following station |
|---|---|---|
| Watson's Crossing towards Derby Castle | Douglas–Ramsey | Ballaglass towards Ramsey Station |

== Also ==
Manx Electric Railway Stations

== Sources ==
- Manx Electric Railway Stopping Places (2002) Manx Electric Railway Society
- Island Images: Manx Electric Railway Pages (2003) Jon Wornham
- Official Tourist Department Page (2009) Isle Of Man Heritage Railways
