= Kathleen Faragher =

Manx writer

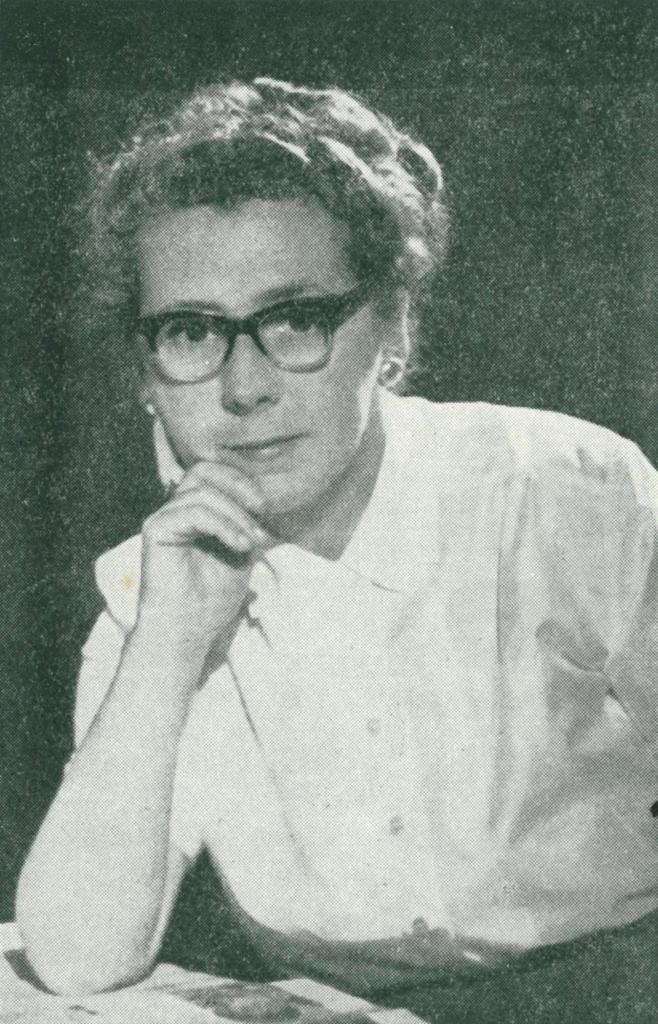
- Kathleen Faragher, as she appears in Where Curlews Call
- Born: Kathleen Faragher; 1904; Ramsey, Isle of Man
- Died: 1974 (aged 69–70); Glen Mona, Maughold, Isle of Man
- Occupation: Poet
- Writing career
- Genres: Poetry, short stories, drama

Kathleen Faragher (1904–1974) was the most significant and prolific Manx dialect writer of the mid twentieth century. She is best known for her poems first published in the Ramsey Courier and collected into five books published between 1955 and 1967. She was also a prolific short story writer and playwright. Her work is renowned for its humour born of a keen observation of Manx characters, and for its evocative portrayal of the Isle of Man and its people.

== Life ==
Kathleen Faragher was born in 1904 in Ramsey, Isle of Man, to Joseph and Catherine Anne Faragher, owners of a grocer and provision merchant business on Approach Road. Kathleen was the youngest of five children: Laurence (who died in Gibraltar in 1944 during WWII), Fred (later manager of Martin's Bank, Peel), Joseph (who took over the family business but died in 1946), Evelyn (who emigrated to Auckland, New Zealand, where she died in 1949) and herself.

Kathleen Faragher was raised in Ramsey until about 1924, when she moved to London to take up a business career. After 25 years working in London, ill-health forced her into early retirement, whereupon she returned to live on the Isle of Man in October 1949. Faragher lived first in Ramsey but eventually moved to Maughold, finally coming to live near to the Dhoon Church in Glen Mona.

== Poetry ==
Faragher's first poem, 'Blue Point', was published in the Ramsey Courier on 14 October 1949. The poem was written whilst in Kent and sent to the paper, who surprised Faragher in accepting it, although it was not published until she had returned to live on the island. This poem was different in style to Faragher's subsequent work and it was only published in her third book of poetry, Where Curlews Call, in 1959, by which time it had been substantially rewritten.

Her next poem, 'Maughold Head', was published at the start of February 1950, after which her poems were published regularly in the Ramsey Courier. Her first published poem in the Anglo-Manx dialect was 'A Lament', which appeared in September 1950. Her poems were quickly picked up as special evocations of the Isle of Man and they were recited at meetings of Manx Societies in England alongside poems by the Manx National Poet, T. E. Brown, as early as November 1951. Her poems, 'Maughold Head' and 'In Exile', were set to music by C. Sydney Marshall and had been cut to record by February 1960.

Her first book of poems, Green Hills by the Sea, was published in February 1955 by The Ramsey Courier Ltd. The book's title is a reference to the popular song, 'Ellan Vannin', composed from a poem by Eliza Craven Green. The book was described as displaying Faragher's "deep insight into Manx feelings and a nostalgic love of the old folk and ways" by George Bellairs. The collection opened with 'Land of My Birth', which she described as "the greatest compliment she can pay to the Manx people" and with which she usually ended her recitals.

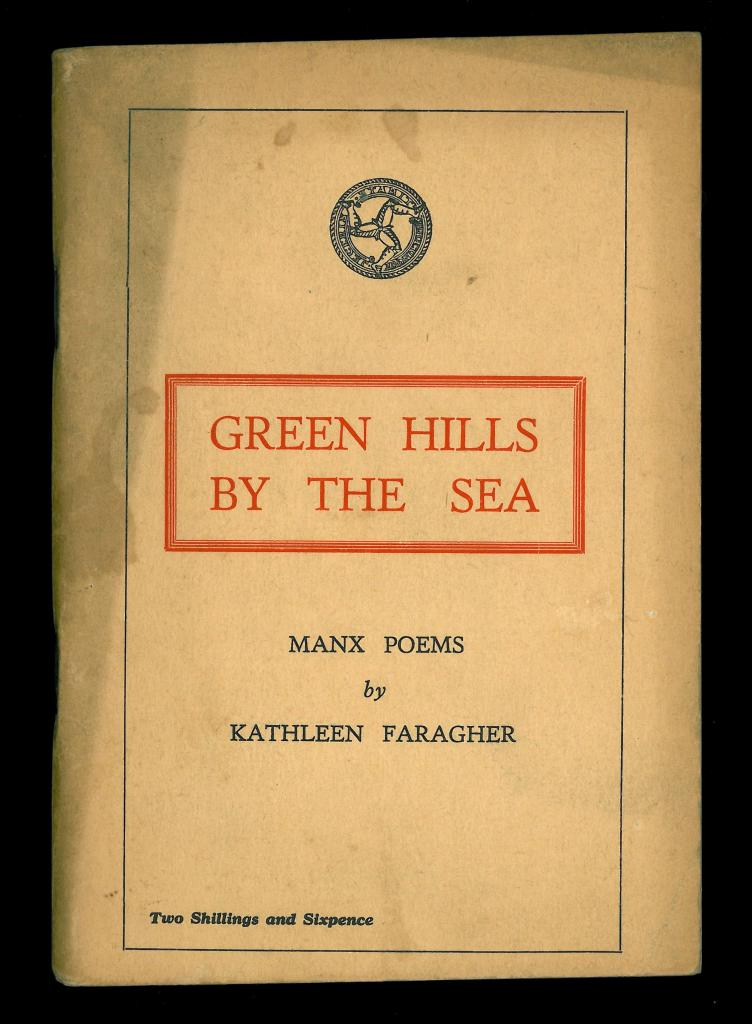
Green Hills by the Sea, Kathleen Faragher's first collection of poetry

I love this purple-misted Isle,
This land where I was born.
The gorse-clad hills and bracken tops,
The fields of waving corn.

[...]

But best of all I love to hear
The gentle, lilting voice
Of kindly Manx folk greeting me:
It makes my heart rejoice,

To feel once more the friendly hand,
To hear the welcome warm,
To look into each smiling face
And know I have come home.

Her second collection, This Purple-Misted Isle, was published in October 1957. The title was another reference to her forebears of Manx literature, this time to T. E. Brown, a reference continued within the collection with Faragher's 'The Immortal "Kitty"' paying homage to Brown's 'Kitty o' the Sherragh Vane' from his Fo'c's'le Yarns. The collection had a Foreword by the Lieutenant Governor, Ambrose Flux Dundas. It proved to be very popular, having to be reprinted by the end of the year, and by the end of 1959 a third print had also almost sold out. This collection included 'The Homecomer', which displays her distinctive Anglo-Manx conversational style:

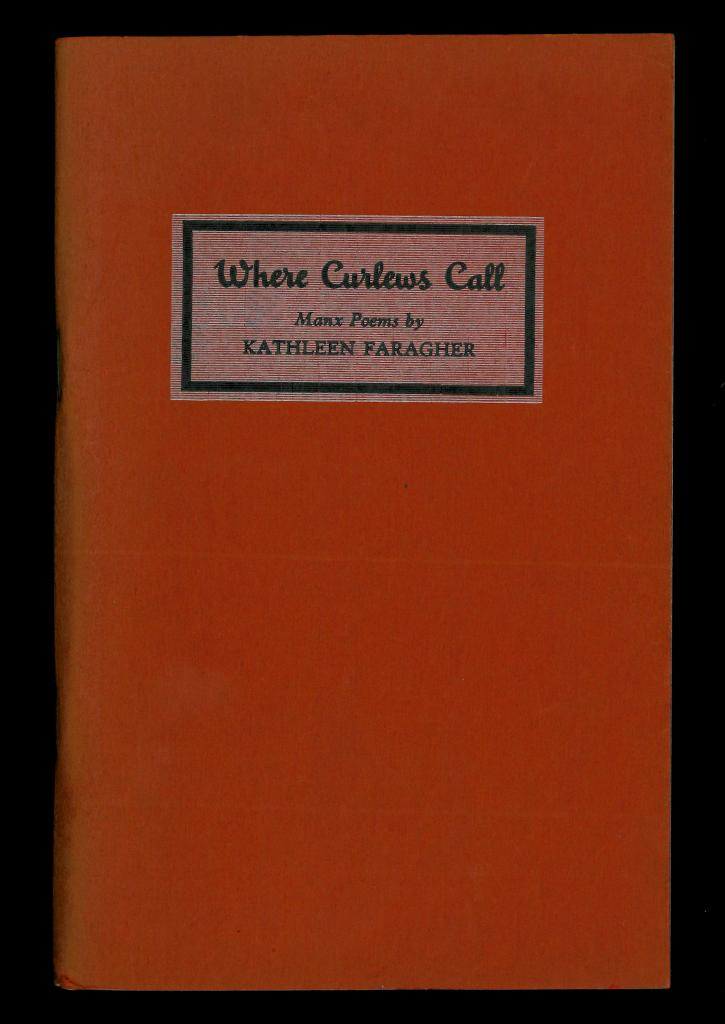
Where Curlews Call, Kathleen Faragher's 1959 book

[...]

"It isn' me dyin' that I min', boy,"
She said as she sat by her bed;
"I'd go peaceful if it wasn' for thinkin'
Ye'll be managin' so maul when I'm dead."
An' Billy sthroked her cheek – so the tale goes –
An' whispered all lovin' an' low,
"Dunt be grievin', Nellie Kate; theer's no need to gel,
To worry about me when yer go!

For theer's the nices' li'l wumman in Laxaa
That I've had me eye on this las' bit;
She'll look after me well, I can tell yer,
So take yer res', Nellie Kate, an' dunt fret!"
My gough! She gorrup from that bed theer
Like an arra shot straight from the bow!
Ay! an' Billy himself was years buried
'Fore herself in the en' had to go!

[...]

By 1959 Faragher's poems had been heard on BBC Radio a number of times, recited both by herself and by others. It was in October of that year that her third collection was released, Where Curlews Call, bearing a perceptive Preface by Sir Ralph Stevenson:

"Our mother tongue has been overlaid by a stereotyped accent [...]. The Manx lilt [...] is all too rapidly fading. She does her best in these poems to keep it alive and at the same times gives a warm and human picture of our farms and crofts and the kindly folk who live in them. For this, if for nothing else, she has earned our gratitude."

Her subsequent collections of poetry were These Fairy Shores (1962) and English and Manx Dialect Poems (1967).

Faragher's poems can be predominantly categorised into two types: light-humoured dialect vignettes or lyrical descriptions of the Isle of Man. Her poems are distinctive in Manx literature in being prevailingly from or of a female perspective and based within the family or home environment.

== Theatre and prose ==
As early as 1951 Faragher had been experimenting with extending her conversational monologue Anglo-Manx poems into theatrical dialogues for performance. In 1964 four such 'character sketches' were published as Kiare Cooisghyn. As was distinctive of her dialect poetry, all of these pieces were written for middle-aged or elderly female characters and used a very tender humour born of a close observation of Manx character. Something of this is shown in the first 'duologue' from the collection, 'The Caffy' in which two women discuss the new café in town:

[...]
Mrs K. An' what like was the china? Gran' mighty I suppose?
Mrs C. Aw! somethin' awful that was! Rale indacent, in fac'. A whole lorra naked childher flyin' about on the plates shootin' bows an' arras.
Mrs K. Aw! them 'ud be l'il Cupids.
Mrs C. Li'l Cupids? Li'l divils, more like! Why wan o' them was the dead spit o' that young dirt Kermid's yandher! Ay! skeetin' up at me through the gravy he was – enough to turn yer!
[...]

She came to concentrate on prose towards the end of her life, publishing By The Red Fuchsia Tree in 1967, a collection of short stories interspersed with reprints of poems from her earlier collections. This was followed by a long series of short dialect stories published under the pseudonym, "Kirree Ann", in the Ramsey Courier at a rate of almost one a week over the last two years of her life. This output of nearly 100 short stories makes her the most prolific Manx short story writer of the twentieth Century.

== Death and legacy ==
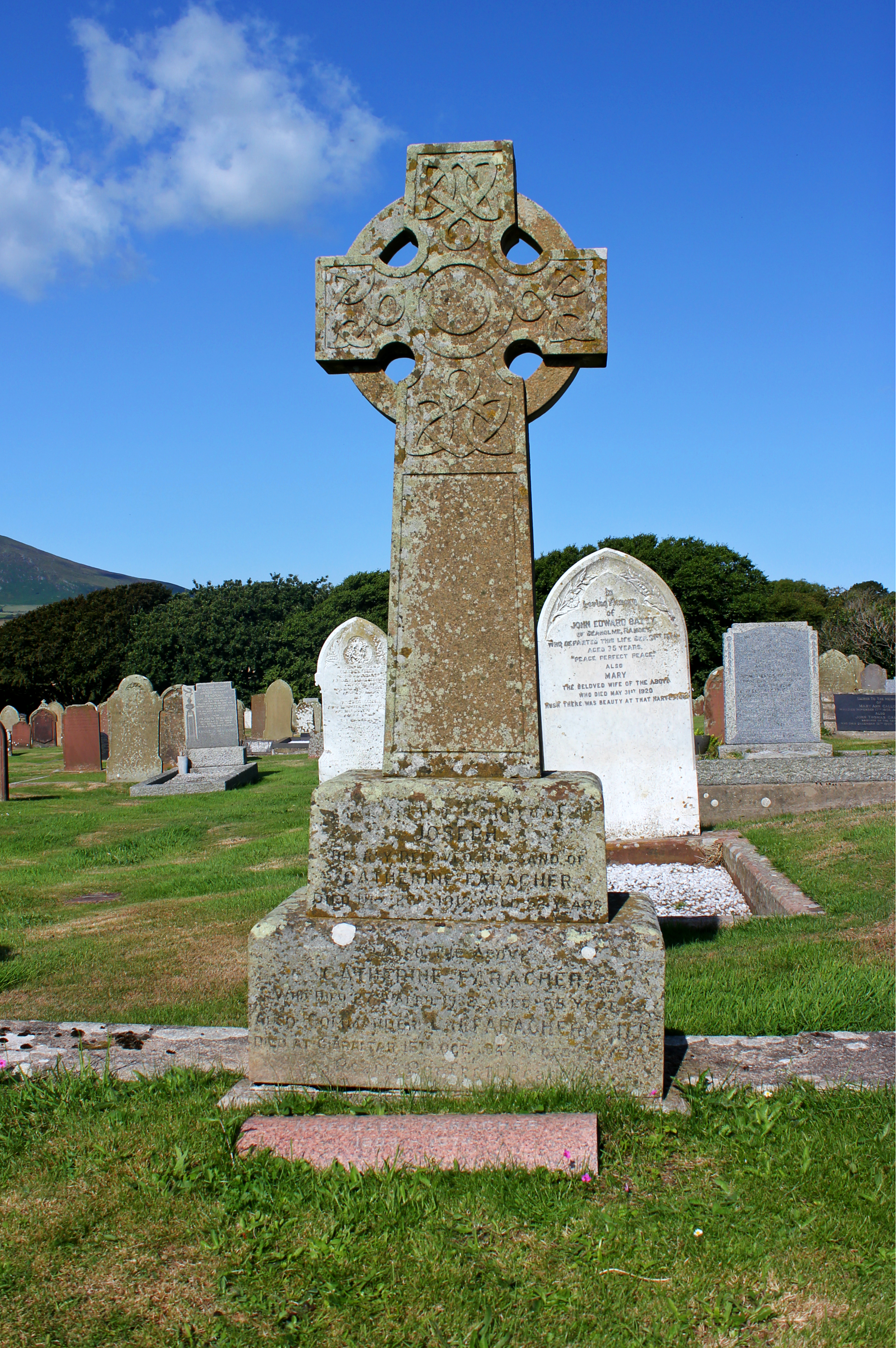
The Faragher family gravestone at Maughold

Kathleen Faragher died in 1974, on the same day as her final story was published in the Ramsey Courier. She was buried in the family plot in Maughold churchyard, a graveyard also associated with other important Manx writers such as T. E. Brown, Hall Caine, Cushag and William Kennish. Six years after her death, her friend, Constance Radcliffe, the leading authority on the local history of Ramsey and Maughold, wrote of Faragher's work that:

"In all her works she expressed her affection for a Manx way of life which has only just disappeared, her kindly humour based on acute observation of people's idiosyncrasies, and her deep and abiding love of the island itself."

Her work continues to be popularly performed in recitals on the Isle of Man, despite none of her books having been republished after her death, and her "Kirree Ann" stories having never been collected.

In 2015 a project to record the memories of those who knew and remember Faragher was launched. Funded by Culture Vannin, it is envisioned to tie in with the Culture Vannin oral history programme, but also to reach more widely to collect unpublished works, memorabilia or other artefacts that might be uncovered. In introducing the initiative, the project organiser gave an estimation of Faragher's work in relation to Manx literature: "the importance of her work to the Isle of Man would be hard to overestimate. It would be a tragedy for Manx culture if we did not do everything in our power to preserve all we can of her memory."

== Publications ==
- Green Hills by the Sea. Ramsey: The Ramsey Courier Ltd. 1954.
- This Purple-Misted Isle. Ramsey: The Ramsey Courier Ltd. 1957.
- Where Curlews Call. Ramsey: The Ramsey Courier Ltd. 1959.
- These Fairy Shores. Ramsey: The Ramsey Courier Ltd. 1962.
- Kiare Cooisghyn. Ramsey: The Ramsey Courier Ltd. 1964.
- English and Manx Dialect Poems. Douglas: Norris Modern Press. 1967.
- By The Red Fuchsia Tree. Douglas: The Norris Modern Press. 1967.
