= Christopher R. Shimmin =

Manx playwright and politician

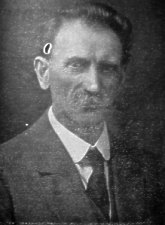
- Christopher R. Shimmin MHK
- Born: September 1870; Peel, Isle of Man
- Died: 9 January 1933; Peel, Isle of Man
- Occupation: Monumental mason
- Writing career
- Period: Victorian, Edwardian
- Genres: Plays, stories
- Subject: Manx Culture
- Literary movement: Anglo-Manx

Christopher R. Shimmin (1870–1933) was a Manx playwright and a member of the House of Keys.

== Life ==
Christopher Robert Shimmin was born in Peel in September 1870, the eldest son of Robert Daniel Shimmin and Eleanor Brew Shimmin. He was an apprentice sailmaker in his grandfather's business before moving to work in England. He emigrated to the United States and there suffered unemployment in c.1895-6. After a period working as a seaman, Shimmin eventually returned to Peel and started his own business as a monumental mason.

In 1919 he was elected as a Member of the House of Keys for Peel as a member of the Manx Labour Party. He was an active and dedicated member of the Labour Party, the president of its Manx wing, often travelling to Britain for meetings and conferences. He served as an MHK until his death at his home at 23 Mona Street, Peel, on 9 January 1933, leaving behind him £3,300 in his will. At the first meeting of the House of Keys after his death, W. P. Clucas eulogised that Shimmin had "lived an unselfish life of service, and his real feelings and character were a burning hatred of injustice wherever met." In the subsequent election for his vacant seat in the House of Keys, his wife Marion Shimmin was voted in, making her the first woman member to be returned to the House of Keys.

He was president of the Manx Society (1924–25), an amateur actor with The Peel Players, a "brother" of The Independent Order of Rechabites (an (alcohol) abstinence Friendly Society), and author of a number of plays and stories in Manx dialect, as well as of an outline of Manx history.

== Writing ==
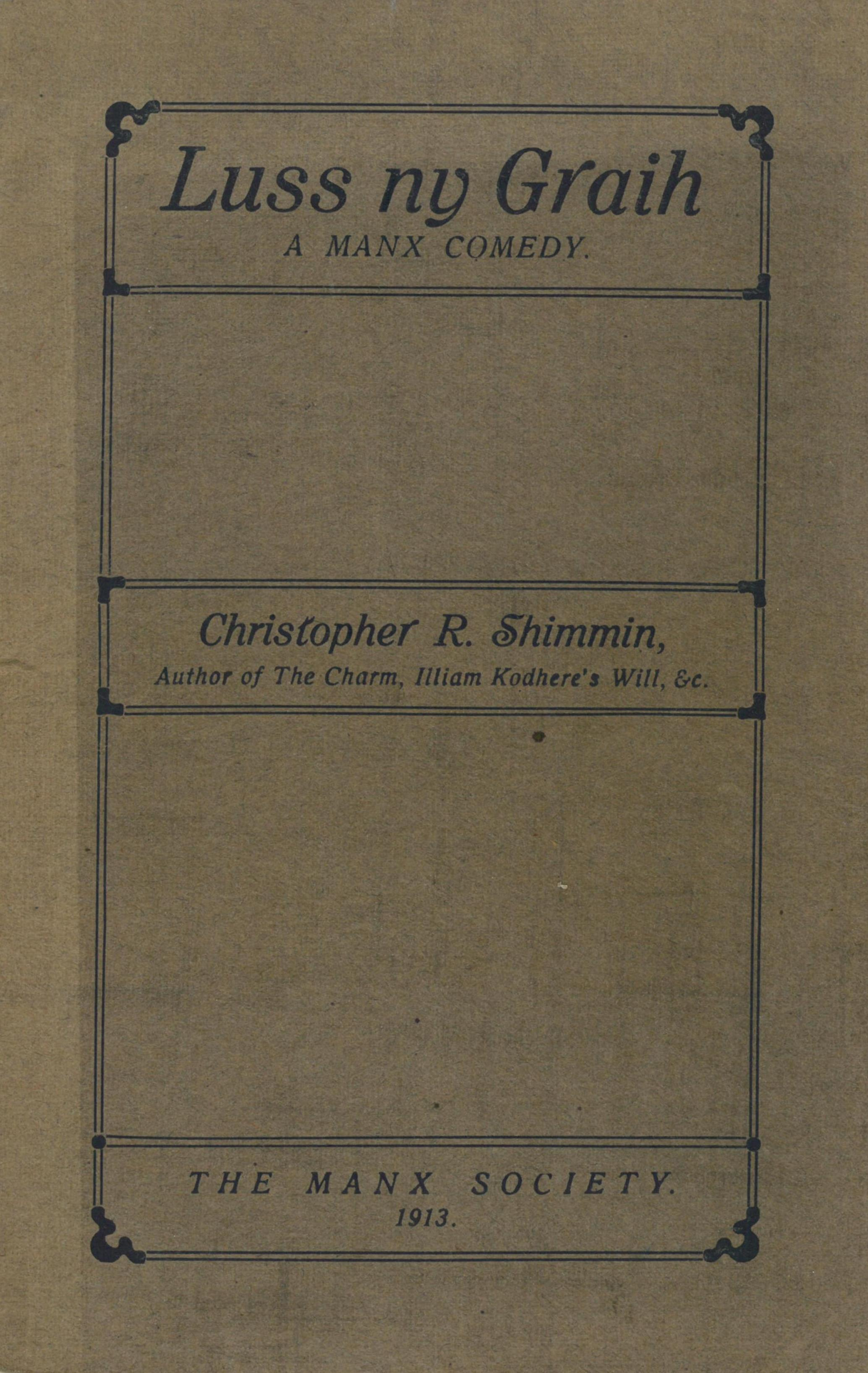
Luss ny Graih, published in 1913

- The Charm (1912) – Manx Comedy, One Act. Published by the Manx Language Society, in Douglas, and sold for sixpence. It was successfully performed in Peel, Douglas and Liverpool in 1912–13.
- The Smuggler (1913) – Short story. Published in Mannin No. 1, May 1913.
  The story is set in Peel around 1820. It concerns a band of poor fishermen with 'unmistakable Celtic features' who have turned to smuggling to earn a living under the yolk of English-imposed taxes. The smugglers out-sail and out-wit the English authorities, with the collusion of other Manx fishermen and farmers, using peaceful means and making an asset of their Manx language and natural knowledge of the sea.
- Illiam Kodhere's Will (1913) – Manx Play, Four Acts. Published by the Manx Language Society, in Douglas, and sold for sixpence. Having been given its premier at the Gaiety Theatre, Douglas on 13 January 1913, the play was successfully performed in Peel, Douglas and Liverpool in 1912–13. In the performance by the Peel Players, Shimmin took the leading role of Dan Quilliam.
- Luss ny Graih (1913) – Manx Comedy, Two Acts. The title translates as "The Love Herb" in Manx. It was originally published in Mannin, and then in booklet form by the Manx Language Society, in Douglas, which was sold for sixpence. It was first performed by The Peel Players on 3 December 1914.
  In 1913 the play was entered into a Manx Society competition and judged to be the best entry by the auspicious panel of W. H. Gill, A. P. Graves and William Boyd Dawkins (though it was not awarded first prize, as it exceeded the word limit). Sophia Morrison announced the play's success in the November 1913 edition of Mannin:

"Luss ny Graih" by Mr. Christopher R. Shimmin, of Peel, secured 270 marks (out of 300), but his play exceeded the word limit and was therefore ruled out for a first prize. On the recommendation of the judges, however, the Manx Language Society gave a prize of £10 to "Luss ny Graih." It is an extremely clever play, with an amusing plot. It will be acted by the Peel Players during the present winter, and the words will be found in the present number of Mannin.

- Dooinney Moyllee (1914) – Manx Comedy, Two Acts. The title translates as "The Man Praiser" in Manx.
- The Third Boat (1915) – Manx Tragedy, Three Acts.
- Outlines from Manx History (1916) – Published in Peel by W.K. Palmer.
- Club Day (1919) – Manx Comedy, One Act. The club of the title is Shimmin's abstinence Friendly Society, The Independent Order of Rechabites.
- Mrs Kelly's Slough (1921)
