= Thomas Edward Brown =

British scholar and poet (1830–1897)

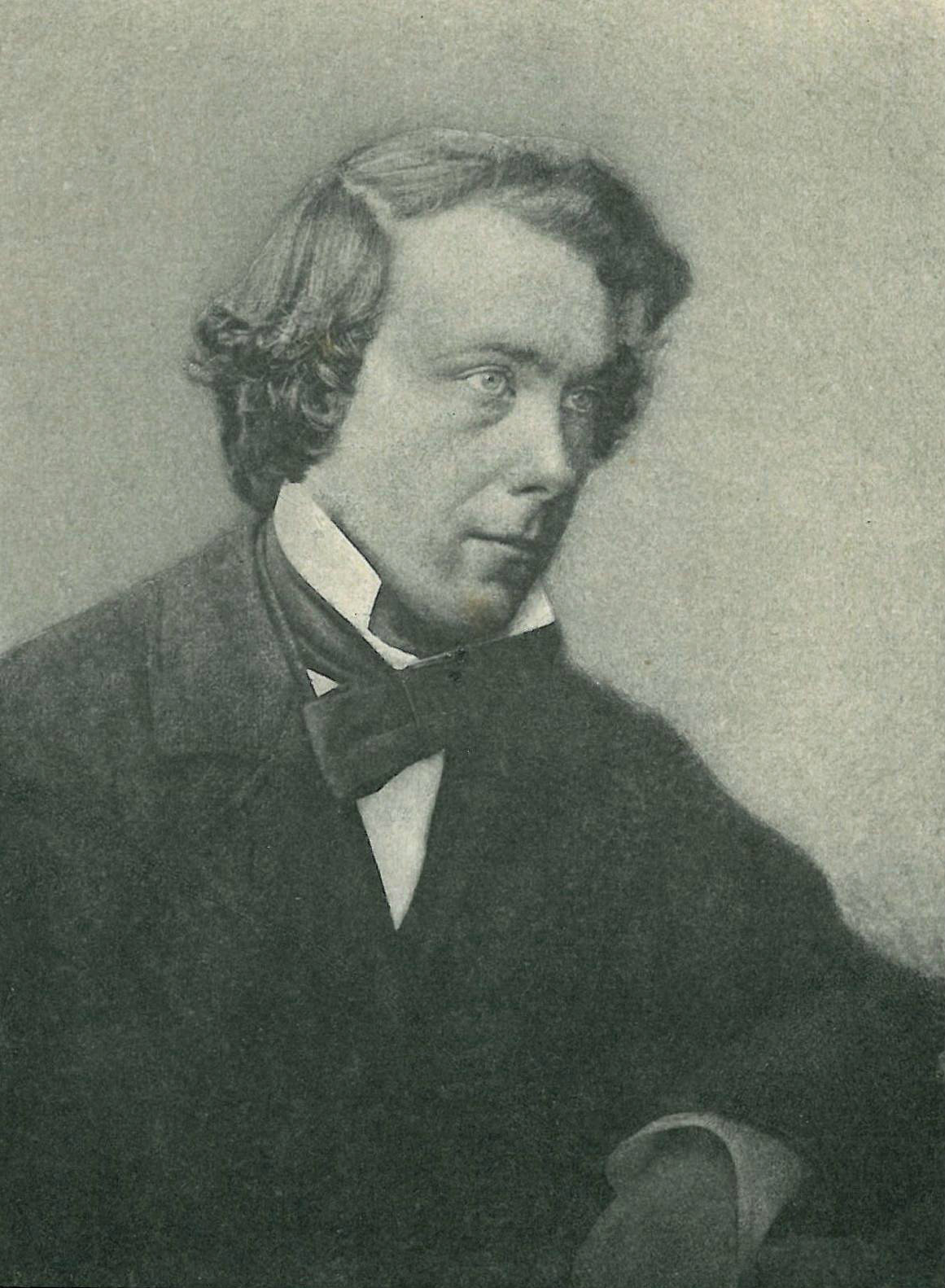
- Born: Thomas Edward Brown; 5 May 1830; Douglas, Isle of Man
- Died: 29 October 1897 (aged 67); Bristol, England
- Resting place: Redland Green, Bristol
- Education: Christ Church, Oxford
- Occupations: Poet, scholar, theologian
- Writing career
- Pen name: T. E. Brown
- Period: Late-Victorian

Thomas Edward Brown (5 May 1830 – 29 October 1897), commonly referred to as T. E. Brown, was a late-19th century scholar, schoolmaster, poet, and theologian from the Isle of Man.

Having achieved a double first at Christ Church, Oxford, and election as a fellow of Oriel in April 1854, Brown served first as headmaster of The Crypt School, Gloucester, then as a young master at the recently founded Clifton College, near Bristol (influencing, among others, poet William Ernest Henley at The Crypt School). Writing throughout his teaching career, Brown developed a poetry corpus—with Fo'c's'le Yarns (1881), The Doctor (1887), The Manx Witch (1889), and Old John (1893)—of narrative poetry in Anglo-Manx, the historic dialect of English spoken on the Isle of Man that incorporates elements of Manx Gaelic. Retiring in 1892 to concentrate on writing, Brown died in 1897 (age 67), during a visit to Clifton.

== Life ==
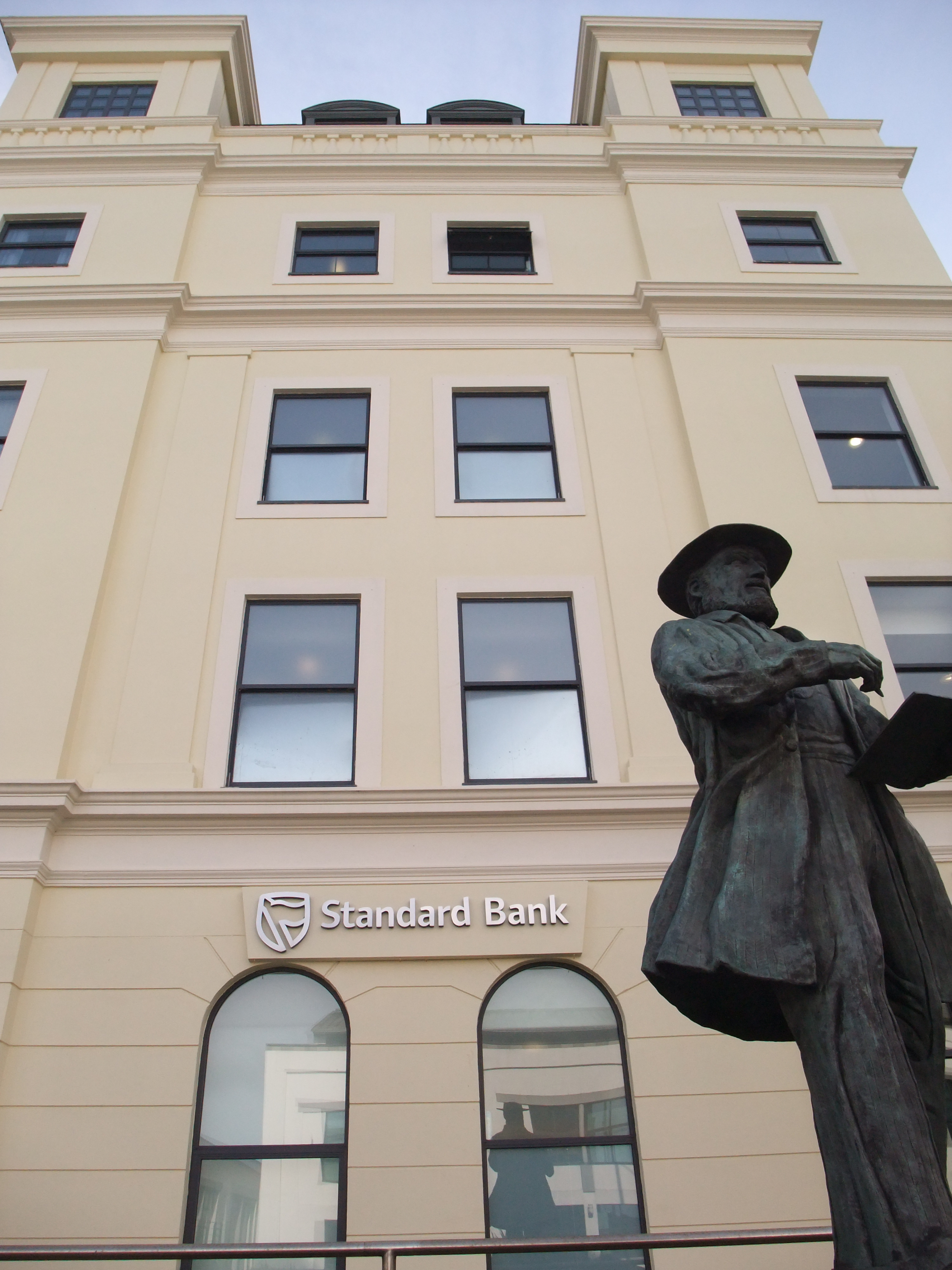
Bronze statue of the Manx poet T. E. Brown at the top of Prospect Hill in Douglas, Isle of Man.

Brown was born on 5 May 1830 in Douglas, Isle of Man, the sixth of ten children born to Reverend Robert Brown and his wife, Dorothy. His elder brother became the Baptist preacher, pastor and reformer Hugh Stowell Brown (10 August 1823 – 24 February 1886). The family relocated to Kirk Braddan when Thomas was two years old.

Brown's father is described as a rather "stern, undemonstrative, evangelical preacher". As Rev. Brown became blind partially, he employed his sons in reading to him from a wide variety of works, excepting novels. Brown educated the boy, assisted by the parish schoolmaster. Young Brown was a shy and timid boy; the family gardener instilled in him a love of nature, and introduced him to Walter Scott's Waverley Novels. At the age of fifteen, Thomas began attending King William's College in Castletown, Isle of Man. It was at this time that he began to write poetry.

Arthur Quiller-Couch writes:

Here his abilities soon declared themselves, and hence he proceeded to Christ Church, Oxford, where his position (as a servitor) cost him much humiliation, which he remembered to the end of his life. He won a double first, however, and was elected a fellow of Oriel in April 1854, Dean [Thomas] Gaisford having refused to promote him to a senior studentship of his own college, on the ground that no servitor had ever before attained to that honour. Although at that time an Oriel fellowship conferred a deserved distinction, Brown never took kindly to the life, but, after a few terms of private pupils, returned to the Isle of Man as vice-principal of his old school. He had been ordained deacon but did not proceed to priest's orders for many years. In 1857, he married his cousin, Miss Stowell, daughter of Dr Stowell of Ramsey …".

Brown left the Isle soon afterward, c. 1857, to accept the job of headmaster of The Crypt School, in Gloucester, where a commission had, through the hiring and other efforts, been attempting to revive the school. Brown was considered distinguished academically; while his tenure at the school was relatively brief (c. 1857–1863)—he reportedly found the burden of administration at the school intolerable—he had great influence during this period, including on William Ernest Henley with whom he overlapped from 1861 to 1863. Years later, after becoming a successful published poet (e.g., of Invictus and other works), Henley would recall Headmaster Brown as a "revelation" and "a man of genius ... the first I'd ever seen", and would eulogise him as one "singularly kind … at a moment … I needed kindness even more than I needed encouragement."

Quiller-Couch continues:

From Gloucester [Brown] was summoned by the Rev. John Percival (afterwards bishop of Hereford), who had recently been appointed to the struggling young foundation of Clifton College, which he soon raised to be one of the great public schools. Percival wanted a master for the modern side, and made an appointment to meet Brown at Oxford; "and there," he writes, "as chance would have it, I met him standing at the corner of St Mary's Entry, in a somewhat Johnsonian attitude, four-square, his hands deep in his pockets to keep himself still, and looking decidedly volcanic. We very soon came to terms, and I left him there under promise to come to Clifton as my colleague at the beginning of the following term." Brown remained [at Clifton College] from September 1863 to July 1892, when he retired—to the great regret of boys and masters alike, who had long since come to regard "T.E.B.'s" genius, and even his eccentricities, with a peculiar pride—to spend the rest of his days on the island he had worshipped from childhood and often celebrated in song.

His poem "Betsy Lee" appeared in Macmillan's Magazine (April and May 1873) and was published separately in the same year. It was included in Fo'c's'le Yarns (1881), which had a second edition in 1889. This volume included at least three other notable poems—"Tommy Big-eyes", "Christmas Rose", and "Captain Tom and Captain Hugh". It was followed by The Doctor and other Poems (1887), The Manx Witch and other Poems (1889), and Old John and other Poems—a volume mainly lyrical (1893). Since his death all these and a few additional lyrics and fragments have been published in one volume by Messrs Macmillan under the title of The Collected Poems of T. E. Brown (1900). ... In October 1897 he returned to the school on a visit. He was the guest of one of the house-masters, and on a Friday evening, 29th October, he gave an address to the boys of the house. He had spoken for some minutes with his usual vivacity when his voice became thick and he was seen to stagger. He died in less than two hours. [Seccombe notes, "He died suddenly at Clifton College while giving an address to the boys, from the bursting of a blood vessel in the brain, on 30 Oct. 1897. He was buried at Redland Green, Bristol."]

Brown's more important poems are narrative, and written in the Manx dialect, with a free use of pauses, and sometimes with daring irregularity of rhythm. A rugged tenderness is their most characteristic note; but the emotion, while almost equally explosive in mirth and in tears, remains an educated emotion, disciplined by a scholar's sense of language. They breathe the fervour of an island patriotism (humorously aware of its limits) and of a simple natural piety. In his lyrics he is happiest when yoking one or the other of these emotions to serve a philosophy of life, often audacious, but always genial.

Hence, Brown created a distinct regional poetic form that earned him the appellation of "Manx national poet".

== Works ==
=== Poetry ===
- Fo'c's'le Yarns. Including the poem "Betsy Lee", First Edition, Macmillan, 1881. New Edition, Macmillan, 1889.
- The Doctor, and Other Poems, 1887, contains the title poem, as well as "Kitty of the Sherragh Vane" and "The Schoolmasters". The title poem is the source of the humorous doublet "Money is honey—my little sonny! / And a rich man's joke is allis funny!"
- The Manx Witch, and other poems, Macmillan & Co., 1889.
- Old John: And Other Poems, 1893. Including the poem "Indwelling" – "If thou couldst empty all thyself of self, Like to a shell dishabited, Then might He find thee on the Ocean shelf, And say—" This is not dead,"—..."
- The Collected Poems of T. E. Brown, Macmillan & Co., 1900. Edited in two volumes by an old friend, Mr S. T. Irwin
- Poems of T. E. Brown, 1922, a compilation of many of Brown's most important poetic works.
