= Manx English =

Historic dialect of English

- Native to: Isle of Man
- Ethnicity: Manx
- Language family: Indo-European: Germanic; West Germanic; Ingvaeonic; Anglo-Frisian; Anglic; English; European English; British English; Manx English
- Early forms: Old English: Middle English; Early Modern English
- Writing system: Latin (English alphabet); English Braille, Unified English Braille)

Language codes
- ISO 639-3: –
- IETF: en-IM
- Location of the Isle of Man between Ireland and Great Britain.

Manx English (Manks English), or Anglo-Manx (Anglo-Manks), is the historic dialect of English spoken on the Isle of Man, though today in decline. It has many borrowings from Manx, a Goidelic language, and it differs widely from any other variety of English, including dialects from other areas in which Celtic languages are or were spoken, such as Welsh English and Hiberno-English.

Early Anglo-Manx contained words of Gaelic and Old Norse origin, but also came to be influenced by the speech of Liverpool and Lancashire in North West England. The Manx historian and linguist Arthur William Moore noted that the dialect varied slightly from parish to parish but that the same turns of phrase and the same stock of words pervaded the whole island. Moore's A Vocabulary of the Anglo-Manx Dialect (Oxford University Press, 1924) and W. Walter Gill's Manx Dialect Words and Phrases (J.W. Arrowsmith, 1934) document the high-water mark of this dialect.

The poet T. E. Brown was one of the first authors to use the Manx dialect in his work.

In the early 20th century, poems and plays in the dialect were written by Cushag, J. J. Kneen, Christopher R. Shimmin and Juan Noa. In the mid-20th century, Kathleen Faragher wrote poetry in the dialect.

Immigration and cultural influences from elsewhere, particularly from Great Britain, have caused the decline of the dialect.

== Research ==
Manx English has been unusually well-researched. In the 19th century, Kirk Christ and Kirk Patrick were covered by surveyors working for Alexander John Ellis's work On Early English Pronunciation. In the 20th century, sites on the Isle of Man were covered by both the Survey of English Dialects and the Linguistic Survey of Scotland. The two sites for the former were Andreas and Ronague; the recordings of the local dialects are now accessible for free online via the British Library.

University of York alumnus James Heathcote published his undergraduate dissertation on 'Sociolinguistic Variation and Change on the Isle of Man'; a copy is stored in the Manx National Heritage Library & Archives.

== Modern Anglo-Manx lexicon ==
Some of the following terms surviving from the original Anglo-Manx dialect are still in occasional use today. The task of identifying dialectal usage is complicated by the large cross-over between Manx Gaelic, idiomatic usage and technical/administrative terms such as "advocate" and "deemster".

- Across – The United Kingdom, in particular Great Britain; referred to as across the water. More rarely, a reference to Ireland.
- At – In possession of (from Gaelic usage). He's got a nice house at him (from Gaelic description of possession)
- Aye – Yes
- Boy – Common address from one male to another, originally an unmarried male (from Gaelic usage). Hey, Boy! is a common greeting between young men.
- Bumbee – Bumblebees, which children were told were bad fairies and captured in "Bumbee Cages".
- Coalie – A coalfish (specifically Pollachius virens).
- Comeover – A non-native person living in the Isle of Man.
- Down North – In contrast to the English Up North. Moore records a usage in the other direction – "He came up to Peel from the Norss"
- Fairy Flower – Red Campion, Silene dioica. (from Gaelic blaa ny ferrishyn, "the fairies' flower")
- Fairy Lugs – Jelly ear fungus Auricularia auricula-judae which grows on the Tramman.
- Fairy's Net – Greater Stitchwort Stellaria holostea
- Falla/Fella – A man/mate (fellow), common to other dialects, but much more frequent in Anglo-Manx.
- For – towards, to; at the period of; wherefore, the reason why; in order to. Are you for goin'? (From Gaelic usage, erson).
- Gilpin – Young fish of indeterminate species, especially Callig.
- Herrin – Herring
- Himself – The master of the house, the husband. Is himself in? (from Gaelic usage; direct translation of eh hene, "himself", emphatic "he").
- In – In existence. The best that's in (from Gaelic usage; direct translation of ayn (in it), there (is)).
- Jinny Nettle – the stinging nettle, Urtica dioica.
- Lhergy – a hill-slope, or high wasteland. Goin' down the lhergy means "going downhill in life" (from Gaelic Lhiargee or Lhiargagh meaning "slope")
- Little People – Fairies, supernatural beings. (from Gaelic usage; direct translation of Deiney Beggey or Mooinjer Veggey, "fairies" or "little people")
- Mann – the Isle of Man; e.g. Gaut made it, and all in Mann
- Manx and Manks – Pertaining to, or originating from the Isle of Man.
- Manxie – A Manx person or a Manx cat.
- Mark – A fishing-ground distinguished by landmarks.
- Middlin' – Tolerable, an equivalent of the Manx, castreycair.
- Neck – impudence; e.g. Oh, the neck of him!.
- Skeet – News, gossip, and also to take a look (take a skeet) at something. Direct usage of Manx word "skeet" or "steet".
- Scutch – A quantity of something; e.g. There were a scutch of people there (from Manx scuitçh, see also Gaelic cooid, "selection", "amount", "number").
- Snigs – Young eels, or sand-eels.
- Themselves – Fairies, supernatural beings.
- Twenty-Four – The House of Keys, based on the number of members. Recorded by A.W. Moore as "Kiare-as-feed", the Manx Gaelic equivalent of the number
- Yessir – Recorded by A.W. Moore in 1924 as a "disrespectful form of addressing a boy or man", used as an informal address to a local acquaintance in modern Anglo-Manx. Early 20th-century sources suggest that its origin may lie in a contraction of You, Sir, but Gaelic scholars have suggested that it is a hangover from Ussey, the emphatic form of You in Manx Gaelic, which is used in a similar context. Not congruous with Yes, Sir in mainstream English.

=== Manx loanwords ===
Words of Manx Gaelic origin frequently cropped up in the original dialect, as did patterns of speech derived from Gaelic usage. In modern usage, much fewer words of Gaelic origin are used, symptomatic of the decline of Manx Gaelic in its later years.

- Bloghan – Pollock (specifically Pollachius virens), Saithe or Coalfish.
- Bollan Bane – Mugwort.
- Bonnag – A flat cake-bread, usually made with dried fruit.
- Brabbag – Pronounced "Bravvag", to warm the backs of the legs by the fire (or 'choillagh').
- Broogh – A steep bank, a grassy cliff/headland.
- Callig – Pollock (specifically Pollachius pollachius).
- Chimlee – A chimney.
- Choillagh – A traditional kitchen fireplace.
- Claddagh – land by a river
- Croagan / Croaghan – A horsefly.
- Cronk – Hill.
- Crosh Bollan – Mouth-bone of the Ballan Wrasse, worn as a charm.
- Crosh Cuirn – A small cross made from twigs from the mountain ash and sheep's wool to protect from evil spirits on 'Oie Voaldyn' (May Day) Eve.
- Cruinnaght – Cultural gathering.
- Cuirn – Mountain ash.
- Curragh – bog, fen or swamp.
- Cushag – ragwort, the National Flower of the Isle of Man.
- Dub – A small hollow, damp area or pool.
- Ellan Vannin – Isle of Man.
- Farrain – Hogweed.
- Garee – Wasteland (sometimes mis-spelt garey which instead means garden).
- Glen – A wooded valley (in Manx this is glioan or glion).
- Gobbag – Pronounced govag, literally a dogfish, but used to mean someone from Peel.
- Haggard – A stackyard, an enclosure on a farm for stacking grain, hay, etc
- Hollin and Hibbin - holly and ivy.
- Hop-tu-Naa – Hallowe'en. Cited by Moore as Hop-the-nei, which he suggests originates from Hop ! ta'n oie but possibly cognate with the Scottish Hogmanay, which is in origin not a Gaelic word.
- Jarrood – From the Manx for forget; people will speak of being a bit jarrood.
- Jough – A drink.
- Keck – Animal dung, literally: shit.
- Keeill – A small ancient monastic cell or chapel.
- Kesh – Suds, fizz, foam, scum, lather, froth. Used as an expression 'keshing like a crab', a phrase with sexual connotations.
- Litcheragh – Lazy.
- Mannin – Manx for Isle of Man. Compare with Ellan Vannin; Mannin is the genitive of Mannan, the name of the son of the god of the sea (Líor), Manannán mac Lír.
- Mhelliah – A festival or party to celebrate harvest.
- Moal – Literally slow, but used in the sense of ill.
- Moaney – Peat-land, heath or moorland.
- Mollag – A dog/sheep skin fishing float; e.g., as fat as a Mollag or as full of wind as a Mollag. In contemporary usage refers to a small potting buoy.
- Qualtagh – The first person met on New Year's Day, first-foot.
- Sally/Sallie – A willow tree, whence the placename Ballasalla derives, from the Manx Shellagh, tr. willow.
- Skeeal – tr. story, or news.
- Spiddag – A small sealing peg from a dog-skin fishing float (Mollag). Used colloquially to refer to something/someone small.
- Suggane – Straw rope made to tie down the thatch on cottages or farm buildings to 'bwhid-suggane' (stone pegs) at the top of the walls.
- Tholtan – Abandoned traditional building.
- Tramman – An elder tree.

=== Norse origin ===
- Fell – hill, of Norse origin.
- Graip/Grep – recorded by Moore as "a manure fork", a hybrid agricultural tool that has parallels with the Norse greip and the Scots graip
- Kirk – Church, used in parish names, of Norse origin
- Sheading – An administrative district of the Isle of Man
- Tynwald – the Manx parliament, from Old Norse Thingvollr and originally written similarly to Icelandic with a þ which is pronounced [θ]. The thing means an assembly or court of justice and the vollr is a field or plain.

=== Superstitions and word replacement ===
V'eh mee-lowit dy enmys mwaagh er boayrd, as conning, marish roddan as kayt. Va'n mwaagh 'fer yn chleaysh vooar', as yn conning 'pomet', as yn roddan 'sacote', as yn kayt 'scraverey'.

— Neddy Beg Hom Ruy 1831–1908, Skeealyn 'sy Ghailck

It was forbidden to name a hare on board, or a rabbit, or a rat or a cat. The hare was 'the big-eared fellow', and the rabbit 'pomet', and the rat 'sacote', and the cat 'scratcher'.

— Edward Faragher 1831–1908, Skeealyn 'sy Ghailck

Because of the unpredictable nature of weather in the Irish Sea, fishing could be a dangerous business – sailors were consequently very superstitious and it was considered taboo to use certain words or behaviours (using the word conney for rabbit, or whistling, for example) whilst on board ship. Some names were substituted for others – "rat" became "sacote" or "long-tailed fellow", amongst other names.

This has evolved into a modern superstition in which the word "rat" (roddan in Manx) is considered unlucky, even when not used aboard ship. Although this particular sea-taboo was one amongst many and was not held to apply on land, it has become a popular modern belief that the word is somehow unlucky, and the sea-taboo has been adopted by some as a typical Manx practice, even though the old Manx people had no qualms in using the word, or its Manx equivalent, roddan. In modern times, even non-local and unsuperstitious people will refrain from using the word "rat", perhaps in an effort to fit in with those who take it seriously, or in an attempt to sound folksy. In reality this is a rather warped version of the original sea-taboo.

Alternative words for rat in neo-Anglo-Manx dialect include longtail, iron fella, Joey, jiggler, queerfella, ringie, and r-a-t (a more recent expression).

=== Anglo-Manx phrases ===
A few phrases have survived to become common parlance, amongst these (all of Gaelic origin):

- Traa dy liooar – (Trah the looar) Manx for "time enough", either an incitement to take things easier, or an insult to a lazy person.
- lhiam-lhiat – (lyam-lyat) An inconsistent person who changes sides easily – from Manx Gaelic for "with me – with thee"
- Bock Yuan Fannee – "John the Flayer's Pony" – on foot, cf "Shanks' pony" in colloquial English.
- Shoh Slaynt – The Manx toast, a Manx translation of "here's health", used as "cheers".
- Goll as gaccan – literally "going and grumbling" in response to the question "How are you?".
- Cair Vie – translates as "fair wind", however is used to wish someone a good trip (i.e. "Safe Travels")

== See also ==
- Regional accents of English speakers
- Gallo (Brittany)
- Lowland Scots

Other English dialects heavily influenced by Celtic languages

- Anglo-Cornish
- Bungi creole
- Hiberno-English
- Highland English (and Scottish English)
- Newfoundland English
- Welsh English
