= Shinty =

Team sport with ball and sticks

Shinty Camanachd, Iomain (Scottish Gaelic)
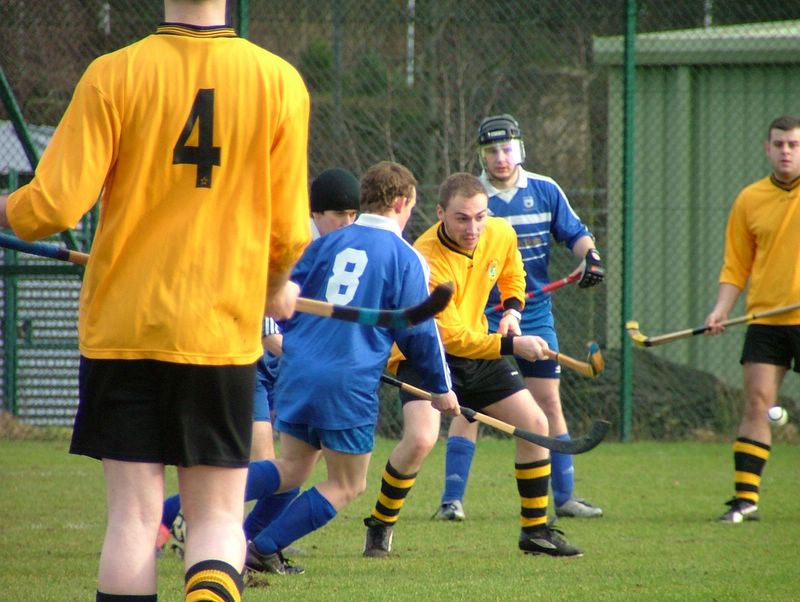
- A shinty game in progress
- Highest governing body: Camanachd Association
- First played: Pre-medieval origins; first codified club formed 9 November 1861
- Registered players: 3449
- Clubs: 48

Characteristics
- Contact: Full
- Team members: 12 players per side substitutes are permitted
- Mixed-sex: Officially No (there are no rules to prevent women from playing in men's teams, a frequent occurrence in the lower leagues, with some of shinty's elite female players playing or having played for lower league men's teams)
- Equipment: Caman

Presence
- Country or region: Scotland

Shinty (Scottish Gaelic: camanachd, iomain) is a team sport played with sticks and a ball. It is played mainly in the Scottish Highlands and among Highland migrants to the major cities of Scotland. The sport was formerly more widespread in Scotland and even played in Northern England into the second half of the 20th century and other areas in the world where Scottish Highlanders migrated.

While comparisons are made with field hockey, the two games have several important differences. In shinty a player is allowed to play the ball in the air and use both sides of the stick. The latter is called a caman, which is wooden and slanted on both sides. The stick may also be used to block and to tackle, although a player may not come down on an opponent's stick, a practice called hacking. Players may also tackle using the body as long as it is shoulder to shoulder.

The game was derived from the same root as the Irish game of hurling/camogie and the Welsh game of bando, but has developed unique rules and features. These rules are governed by the Camanachd Association. A composite rules shinty–hurling game has been developed in which Scotland and Ireland play annual international matches.

Another sport with common ancestry is bandy, which is played on ice. In Scottish Gaelic the name for bandy is "ice shinty" (camanachd-deighe) and bandy and shinty (and shinney) could be used interchangeably in the English language.

== Origins ==
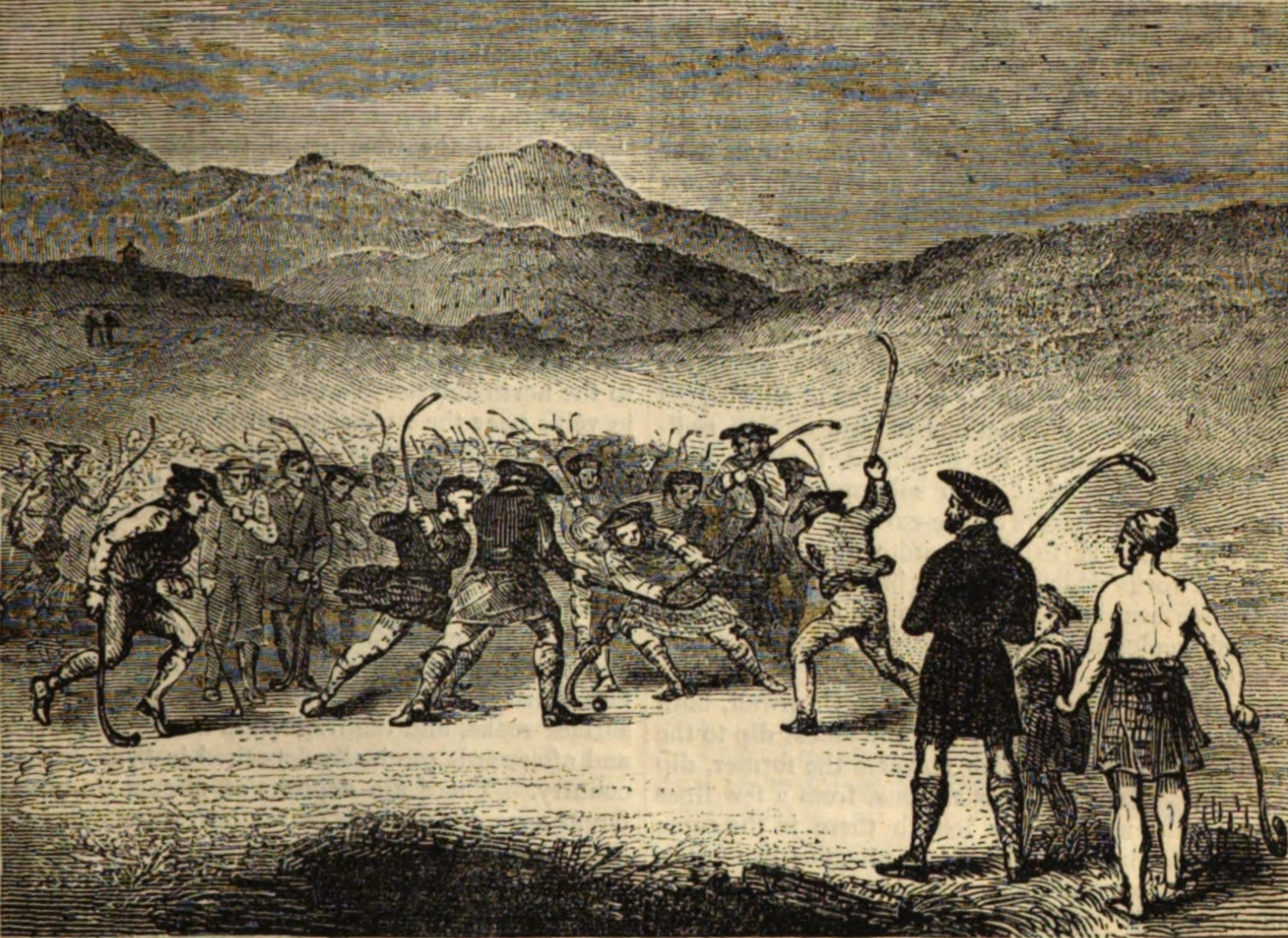
1835 woodcut illustration of a game of shinty being played in the Scottish Highlands

Hurling, an Irish pastime for at least 2,000 years similar to shinty, is derived from the historic game common to both peoples. Shinty/hurling appears prominently in the legend of Cúchulainn, the Celtic mythology hero. A similar game is played on the Isle of Man known as cammag, a name cognate with camanachd. The old form of hurling played in the northern half of Ireland, called "commons", resembled shinty more closely than the standardised form of hurling of today. Like shinty, it was commonly known as camánacht and was traditionally played in winter. It is still played regularly on Saint Stephen's Day in St John's.

The origins of the name shinty are uncertain. There is a theory that the name was derived from the cries used in the game; "shin ye", "shin you" and "shin t'ye", other dialect names were shinnins, shinnack, shinnup. chinnup, Alernatively, as Hugh Dan MacLennan proposes, from the Scottish Gaelic sìnteag. However, there was never one all-encompassing name for the game, as it held different names from glen to glen, including cluich-bhall ('play-ball' in English) and in the Scottish Lowlands, where it was formerly referred to as hailes, common/cammon (caman), cammock (from Scottish Gaelic camag), knotty, carrick and various other names, as well as the terms still used to refer to it in modern Gaelic, camanachd or iomain. Shinty was once a popular game in lowland Scotland, as shown by its name shintie, a term which took that form around 1700, displacing the earlier shinnie – of which there is a written record about 100 years earlier. Shinnie may also derive from shin in English, with the affix -ie, a common termination to the name of many games in Scotland.

== Game ==
=== Playing area ===
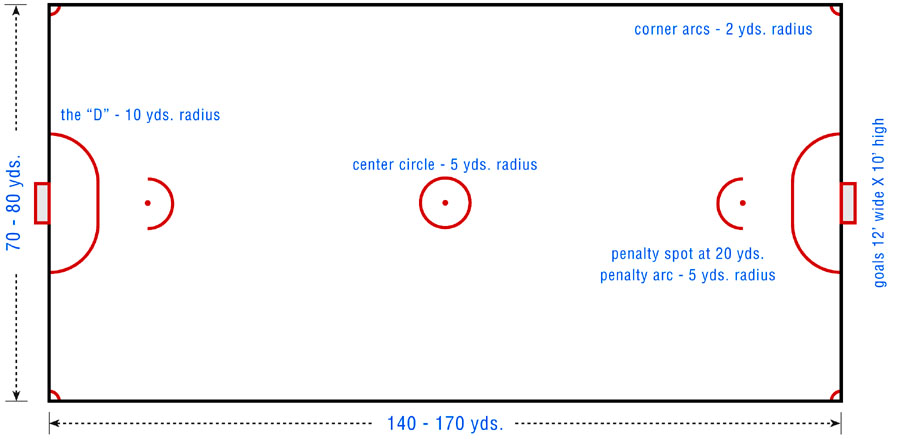
The field of play

The objective of the game is to play a small ball into a goal, or "hail", erected at the ends of a 140-to-170-yard-long (128 to 155 m) by 70-to-80-yard-wide (64 to 73 m) pitch. The game is traditionally played on grass, although as of 2009 the sport may be played on artificial turf. The pitch also has marks indicating a 10-yard (10 m) area around the goals, the penalty and centre spots (along with their associated arcs/circles of 5 yards or 5 metres radius), and corner arcs at the corners of the rectangular pitch of 2 yards or 2 metres radius. The goals, at opposite ends of the field, measure 12 feet (3.66 m) wide and 10 feet (3.05 m) high and a net is affixed to catch the ball when a goal is scored.

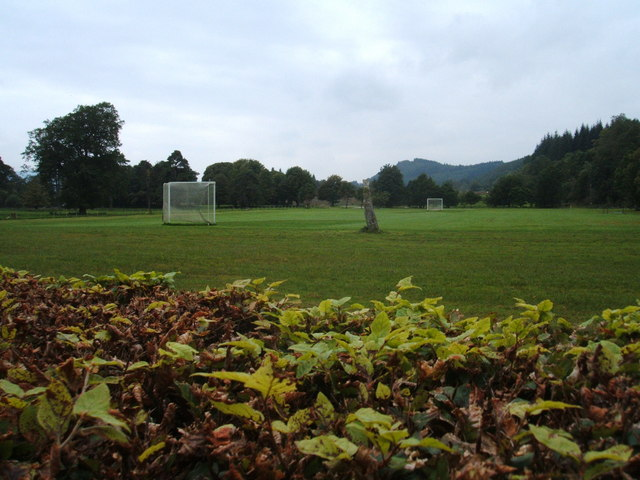
Shinty field (Winterton), Inveraray

=== Ball ===
The ball is a hard solid sphere of around half the diameter of a tennis ball, consisting of a cork core covered by two pieces of leather stitched together. The seam is raised. It is very similar to a hurling sliotar in that it resembles an American baseball with more pronounced stitching. The permitted circumference is between seven and a half and eight inches (19 and 20 cm) and weight between two and a half and three ounces (71 and 85 g). The ball is usually white, but there is no statutory colour with black being a common colour for Kyles Athletic.

Plastic balls or soft balls are often used in youth competitions such as the variant "First Shinty".

=== Stick ===
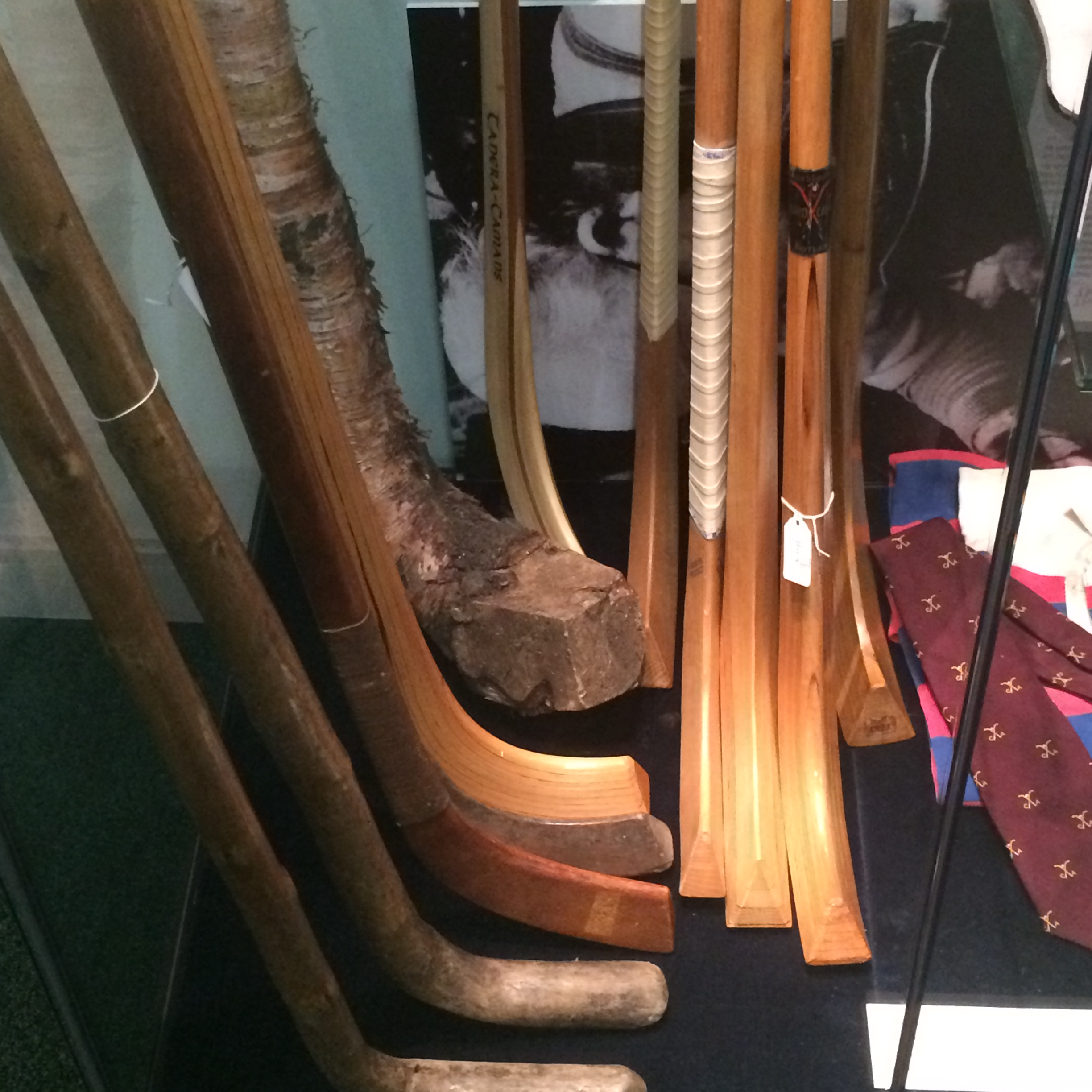
Showing the development of shinty sticks through the years

The ball is played using a caman, which is a stick about 3 1/2 feet (1.1 m) long with two slanted faces. The stick has a wedge shaped head, roughly triangular in cross section, which must be able to pass through a ring two and a half inches (6.4 cm) in diameter. Unlike the Irish camán, it has no blade. The caman is traditionally made of wood, traditionally ash but now more commonly hickory, and must not have any plate or metal attached to it. The caman would be made from any piece of wood with a hook in it, hence caman, from the Scottish and Irish Gaelic word cam, meaning bent or crooked. It can also be called a stick or club. The slant of the face will vary according to the position that the stick is used for. It can be made according to the player's height.

Plastic camans are common in the youth variant "First Shinty".

== Rules of play ==
A player can play the ball in the air and is allowed to use both sides of the stick. The stick may also be used to block and to tackle, although a player may not bring their stick down on an opponent's stick, which is defined as hacking. A player may tackle an opponent using the body as long as it is shoulder-to-shoulder as in association football (soccer).

A player may only stop the ball with the stick, the chest, two feet together or one foot on the ground. Only the goalkeeper may use his hands, but only with an open palm since he is not allowed to catch it. Playing the ball with the head constitutes a foul whether intentional or not, as it is considered dangerous play. Other examples of dangerous play, which will be penalised, are a player, while grounded, playing the ball, or a player recklessly swinging the caman in the air in a way which might endanger another player.

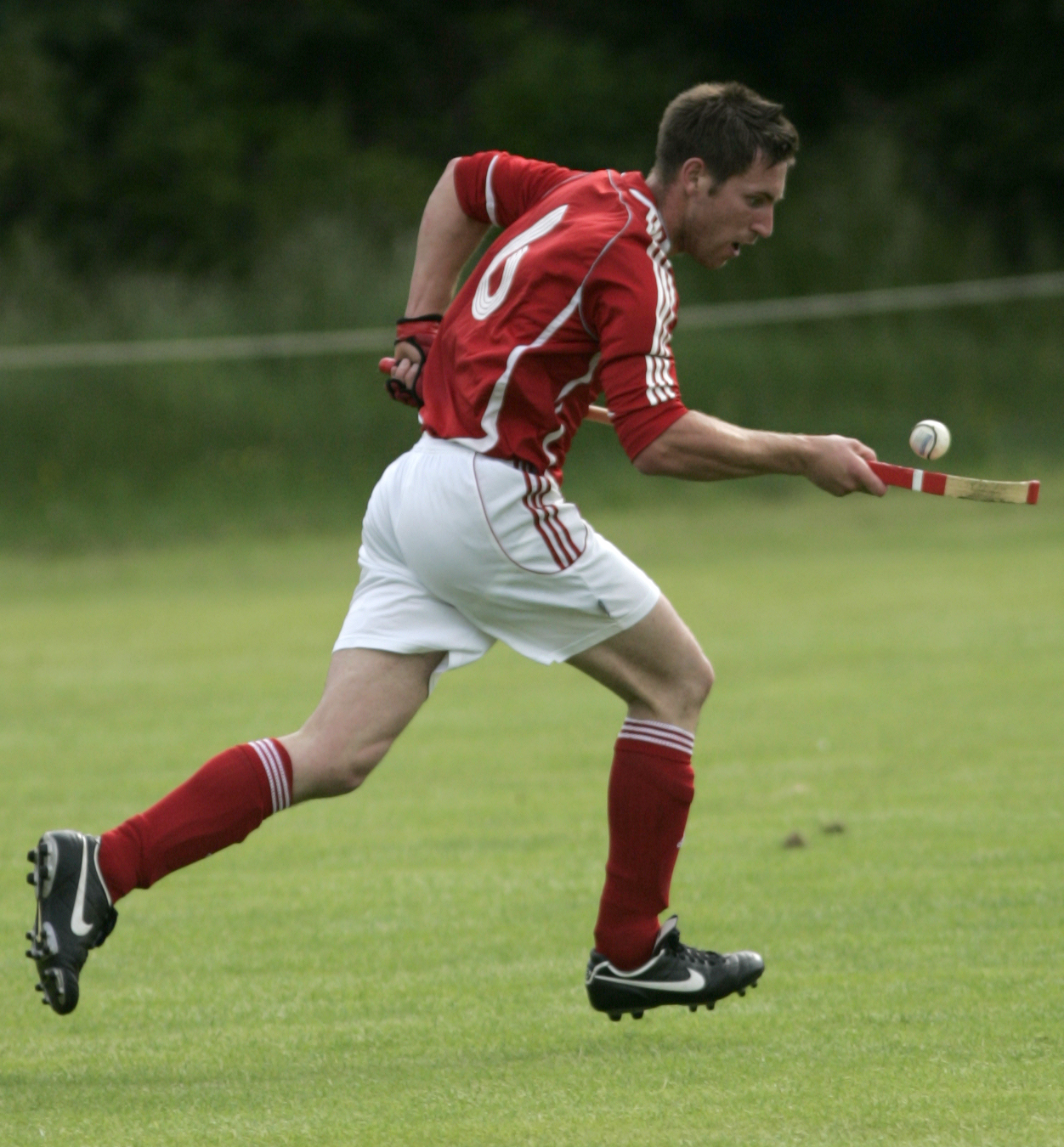
A player doing keepy-uppy

Fouls are penalised by a free-hit, which is indirect unless the foul is committed in the penalty area, commonly referred to as "The D". This results in a penalty hit from 20 yards (18 m).

A ball played by a team over the opposing bye line results in a goal hit from the edge of the D, while a ball played by a team over their own line results in a corner. A ball hit over the sideline results in a shy: a shinty shy involves the taker tossing the ball above his head and hitting the ball with the shaft of the caman, and the ball must be directly overhead when struck.

=== Scoring ===
The winner of a game is the team that scores the most goals. A team scores a goal "when the whole of the ball has passed over the goal-line and under the cross-bar". A goal can only be scored with the caman; there is no goal when the ball "has been kicked, carried or propelled by hand or arm by a player of the attacking side." A goal cannot be scored directly from a free-hit.

=== Team size ===
Teams consist of 12 players (men) or 10 players (women), including a goalkeeper. A match is played over two halves of 45 minutes. With the exception of the goalkeeper, no player is allowed to play the ball with his hands. There are also variants with smaller sides, with some adjustments in the field size and duration of play.

=== Substitutions ===
As with sports such as football, shinty originally did not have substitutes. These were introduced in the 1960s, progressively expanding to allow a maximum of three substitutions per game. As of 2011, a rule change allowed for rolling substitutions to be made at the senior level.

== Organisation ==
In common with many sports, shinty became formalised in the Victorian Era and the first organised clubs were established in cities such as Glasgow and London where there were thousands of Gaels resident.

In 1887, a historic game was played between Glenurquhart Shinty Club and Strathglass Shinty Club in Inverness. This game was attended by thousands of people and was a major milestone in developing a set of common rules. This fixture was to be repeated on 12 January 2007 in Inverness as the opening centrepiece of the Highland 2007 celebrations in Scotland, but was postponed due to a waterlogged pitch.

The modern sport is governed by the Camanachd Association (Scottish Gaelic: Comann na Camanachd). The association came into being in the late Victorian era as a means of formulating common rules to unite the various different codes and rules which differed between neighbouring glens. Its first meeting was held in Kingussie in 1893.

The Camanachd Association maintained its initial structure for much of its first century. The 'Future of Shinty' Report published in 1981 led to a complete restructuring of the way in which shinty was organised and managed. That led to the move away from a dependence on volunteers to govern the sport, to the Association's first salaried employees.

== Competitions ==
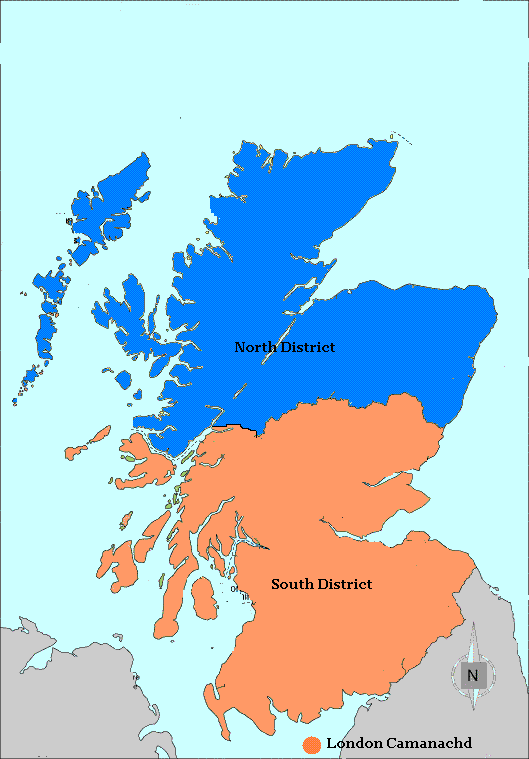
Map of Scotland showing North/South divide in shinty

There are shinty clubs in Aberdeen, Aberdour (Fife), Edinburgh, Glasgow, Perth, Cornwall, Oxford and even London. University Shinty is a popular section of the sport, with almost all Scotland's main universities possessing a team. Historically, Glasgow University, Aberdeen University and Edinburgh University have vied for supremacy, but in recent years, Strathclyde University, Robert Gordon University, Dundee University, and the University of St. Andrews have risen to prominence. Clubs compete in various competitions, both cup and league, on a national and also North/South basis. While the top Premier Division has been played on a Scotland-wide basis since 1996, with a second National tier added in 1999, folding in 2006 before being reinstated in 2014, whilst the lower 2 leagues are based on geography. Many clubs run second teams that also compete in these leagues against clubs with only one senior side.

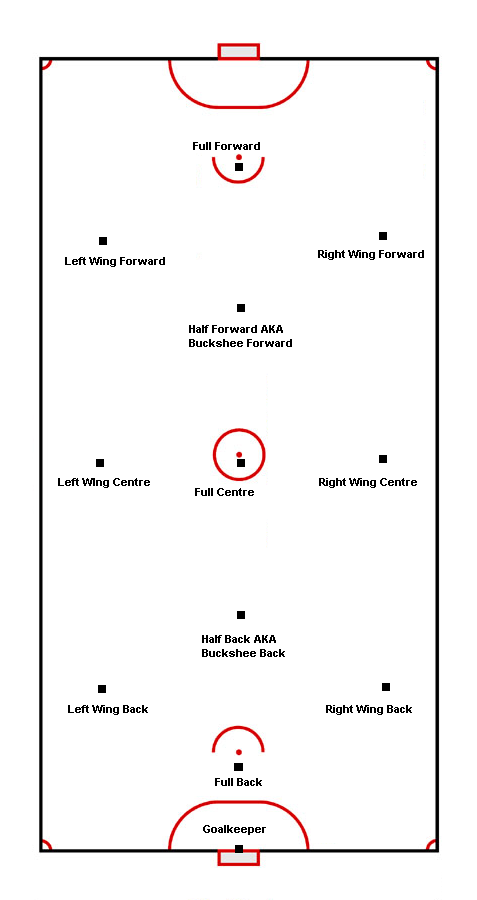
North tactics

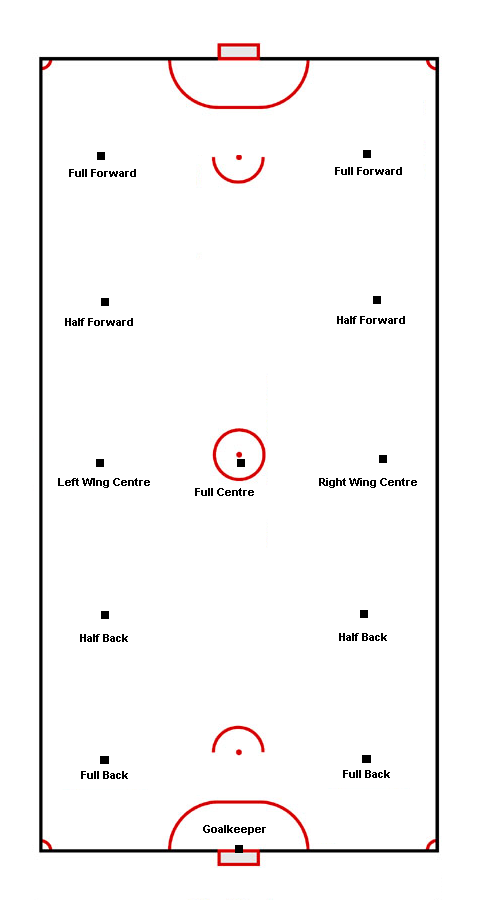
South tactics

=== Season ===
Shinty was traditionally played through the winter, based around the tradition of the "Iomain Challainn", where New Year was marked by a game between neighbouring parishes. The summer was left free for seasonal work and friendly tournaments. The Winter season always ran over, however, and many teams would find themselves finishing the previous season only weeks before the next one would start.

In 2003, shinty clubs voted for a trial period of two years of a summer season from March to October, with a view to moving permanently to summer shinty if the experiment was judged to be a success. Despite opposition from the "Big Two", Kingussie Camanachd and Newtonmore Camanachd Club, and other small groups in the game, an Extraordinary General Meeting in November 2005 voted by an overwhelming majority (well over the required two thirds) to make summer shinty the basis upon which the game would proceed.

There have been teething problems since the move to summer shinty, with a couple of teams being culpable for the season running over into November and December. Season 2010 saw the league season finished by the first weekend in October, almost on schedule.

Shinty does still get played during the winter, in University Shinty which has teams compete for the second most valuable trophy in Scottish sport – the Littlejohn Vase – and in New Year fixtures, the most prestigious of which is the Lovat Cup, played between Beauly Shinty Club and Lovat Shinty Club.

=== Leagues ===
For more information, see Shinty league system

League shinty was originally organised on a regional basis, with distinct competitions for the North District and at one time, two separate leagues for Argyll (the Dunn League) and the Southern League, for clubs in Glasgow and Edinburgh and the surrounding areas. Over time, there have been moves to amalgamate leagues and, since the 1980s, a push for national competition at the highest levels. In the modern era of league shinty, Kingussie have been unsurpassed in their domination of the sport; according to the Guinness Book of Records 2005, Kingussie are world sport's most successful sporting team of all time, winning 20 consecutive league championships and going four years without losing a single fixture in the early 1990s.

Kingussie's unmatched run of dominance was ended on 2 September 2006 by rivals Newtonmore, who defeated Oban Camanachd 2–0 to ensure that Kingussie could not catch the team at the top of the Premier Division. However, Newtonmore were unable to replace their neighbours as champions, as the first post-Kingussie champions were confirmed as Fort William, who sealed the title on 30 September 2006, having won their games in hand over Newtonmore. Kingussie regained the title in 2007. In the 2010s, Newtonmore were the dominant league force, whilst Kingussie have dominated the 2020s, lifting their fifth successive title in 2025.

=== Cup ===
Cup shinty has always been seen as being more important than league shinty, and the premier national competition remains the Scottish Cup or the Camanachd Association Challenge Cup, the Camanachd Cup for short. Until 1983 the competition was designed to ensure the final was between the North and South.

The Macaulay Cup still preserves a guaranteed North/South Final. There are national equivalents for the Camanachd Cup for intermediate and junior teams, with the Balliemore Cup being for National Division sides, and the Sutherland for clubs in the 3rd tier and below. There are regional cups for both senior and junior teams; the MacTavish Cup is the senior cup for the North and the Glasgow Celtic Society Cup is the one for the South. The Bullough (South) and Strathdearn (North) are available to junior sides. In 2022 an additional cup was introduced for single team clubs, which was renamed to the Chieftain's Cup in 2025 in honour of the first Chieftain of the Camanachd Association.

=== Shinty and hurling internationals ===
In recognition of shinty's shared roots with hurling, an annual international between the two codes from Scotland and Ireland is played on a home and away basis using composite rules. In recent years, the Irish have had the upper hand, but the Scots won the fixture narrowly in 2005 and again in 2006, this time at Croke Park, Dublin, albeit with the Irish fielding weaker players from the second tier Christy Ring Cup. Scotland made it four in a row when they won in 2008. After falling into abeyance due to the pandemic, the series was revived in 2022, with Ireland winning 3 successive International Quiachs' in Newry, Ennis and Inverness.

Scotland are the most recent champions, having won the 2026 edition at Páirc Uí Chaoimh on 24 October.

== Outside Scotland ==
Canadian Gaelic-speaking pioneers in Nova Scotia adapted shinty, which was traditionally a winter sport, to the much colder Canadian climate by wearing ice skates while playing on frozen lakes. This led to the creation of the modern winter sport known as hockey.

The game of shinny in Canada is a synonym for street hockey, pond hockey or any informal game of hockey. It derives its name from shinty, although a myth there perpetuates that it came from children tying Eaton's catalogues around their legs to protect their shins from flying pucks or slashing.

The English Shinty Association (ESA) is the main body for promoting and encouraging the sport of shinty in England.

London Camanachd is a shinty club first established in the Victorian era, competing in English and Scottish competitions such as the English League, the Bullough Cup and most recently in the Camanachd Cup in 1994. They went into abeyance in 1995, but were reconstituted in 2005. They played the first officially recognised shinty match outside Scotland in 80 years on 22 July 2006 against the Highlanders. They compete annually in the English Shinty Championships against Cornwall, Oxford, Devon and Bristol as well as playing shinty–hurling matches and organising sporadic friendlies against visiting teams.

On 28 December 2010 Ireland held its first dedicated shinty match in Westmeath, with players who have played the Compromise rules Shinty/Hurling.

A Cornwall Shinty Club was established in 2012, playing their first game on 21 April 2012 against London; the match finished a draw. They also entered the St Andrew's Sixes tournament in 2012. Following this, in December 2012, two more Cornish clubs were created; the first being the Combined Universities of Cornwall and the second being Mabe. These two teams put forward their best players to play for the Cornwall Shinty Club.

There was a team in Northallerton in the 1970s, which competed in six-a-sides; and on 1 August 2012 a re-vamped Northallerton Shinty Club was formed. The club is hoping to draw in a few former players, but wants to focus on raising awareness of the game in Yorkshire and bringing new local players into the game.

Shinty was played widely in England in the 19th century and early 20th century, with teams such as London Scots, Bolton Caledonian and Cottonopolis; Nottingham Forest F.C. was established by shinty players.

Since 2012 London has hosted the annual "London Shinty Festival", which has been attended by Cornwall, London, Oxford Shinty Club, St Andrews university ladies team, and the Scots. It is an open tournament held in late September after the Shinty season is finished to allow any travelling teams the opportunity to attend.

Since 2013, a combined English Shinty Association side has entered the Bullough cup, being beaten in 2013 by Tayforth and then in 2014 by Ballachulish. Shinty is played in the British Army, with The Scots Shinty Club keeping alive the tradition of the game being played in the Forces.

Shinty is also being revived among the Scottish diaspora in North America, where it was originally played in the 18th and 19th century by Scottish immigrants, but died out. More recent teams such as Northern California Camanachd Club (NCCC), Central California Cammanchd (CCC), and Oregon Shinty-Camanachd (OSC) play at Highland games and other venues across the USA.

== Media coverage ==
Local papers, such as the West Highland Free Press, The Buteman, the Oban Times and the Dunoon Observer and Argyllshire Standard, have in-depth shinty reports. The Inverness-based media reduce shinty coverage to one summary of the whole weekend's action, as do national newspapers, such as the Sunday Herald and the Sunday Post. The only significant national press coverage is of the Camanachd Cup final. Regional newspaper The Press and Journal runs shinty coverage twice a week (Mondays and Fridays).

The first-ever shinty match broadcast live on television was the 1964 Celtic Society Cup Final. Although Camanachd Cup finals and internationals have been shown over the years, 2006 marked the first-ever regular TV deal for shinty with matches being shown on the BBC Sports show Spòrs. This was then followed by the STV show An Caman.

2009 saw the Camanachd Association sign a deal with BBC Alba to broadcast all national finals as well as the Marine Harvest Festival. The MacAulay Cup and Camanachd Cup final were also shown on BBC Two. There is also an increasing amount of shinty on the internet, with various clips garnering attention on video sites such as YouTube. 2011 was a sparse year for TV coverage outside of the usual games, but 2012 saw several games filmed live on BBC Alba.

The sport is featured on BBC Radio nan Gaidheal by the programme, Spòrs na Seachdain, although English-language radio interest is usually restricted to the big events in the year. Commentary on the Camanachd Cup Final is provided in both English and Gaelic.

== In popular culture ==
=== Literature ===
- In his 1783 poem Moladh Gheàrrloch ('In Praise of Gairloch'), Gaelic bard William Ross (1761–1791) describes a game of shinty, which was still a winter sport played in the Gàidhealtachd upon St. Andrew's Day, Christmas Day, New Year's Day, Handsel Monday, and Candlemas. The bard's account of the annual New Year's Day match at ebb tide upon the Big Sand (Scottish Gaelic: Gainmheach Mhòr) of Gairloch, is, according to Ronald Black, "as succinct a description as we have of the great festive shinty matches of the past."
- The author Margaret Hope MacPherson wrote a children's book called The Shinty Boys, which was published in 1963.

=== Music ===
- The shinty song "Clash of the Ash", by the Celtic rock band Runrig, immediately became widely popular and is now considered an anthem for the sport.

=== Television ===
- In September 2009 comedian Billy Connolly suggested that shinty should become Scotland's new national sport, because the Scotland men's national football team had become so bad.
- The accordionist Gary Innes wrote "The Caman Man" on his latest album ERA and has played shinty for Scotland fourteen times, captaining the side in 2010/11.
- The TV series Hamish MacBeth featured a shinty match as an integral part of the plot of the episode "More Than a Game", with real shinty players Dallas Young of Kingussie and Neil "Ach" MacRae of Kinlochshiel Shinty Club, playing pivotal roles.
- A shinty game is shown in episode 4, "The Gathering", of the Starz TV show Outlander.

=== Video Games ===
- In May 2025 an indie game developer working under the alias of his studio "Peatfire Games" announced the early beginnings of the worlds first Shinty video game; 'Pure Shinty'
- The sports simulation game follows a similar format to other games like FIFA and a free demo was released on the Steam platform during early development.
- The game features real teams and players from across Scotland and allows the player to heavily customise their content and experience.

== See also ==
- Women's shinty
- Lacrosse, of ancient Native American origin, where the stick is used to catch, throw, and carry the ball
- Field hockey
- Bando
- Cammag
- Hurling
- Camogie
