= Cammag =

Team sport originating on the Isle of Man

- Highest governing body: none
- Clubs: none

Characteristics
- Contact: Yes
- Team members: ~20
- Mixed-sex: No
- Type: Team sport
- Equipment: Camman; Crick

Presence
- Country or region: Isle of Man
- Olympic: No

Cammag (Manx pronunciation: [ˈkʰamaɡ]) is a team sport originating on the Isle of Man. It is closely related to the Scottish game of shinty and the Irish game of hurling. Once the most widespread sport on Mann, it ceased to be played in the early twentieth century after the introduction of association football and is no longer widely-played.

Equipment included a stick (Manx: camman, meaning "little curved thing") and a ball (crick or crig) with anything up to 200 players. Sometimes whole towns and villages took part, or even played each other. The camman was similar in design to the caman in shinty, both having no blade unlike the Irish camán. A gorse wood camman, if of suitable size and shape, was a very much treasured possession. The crick can be made from cork or wood, and varied from circular to egg-shaped, sized from approximately two inches in circumference to 'the size of a fist'. Old accounts tell that the crick was sometimes covered in cloth or leather.

Cammag season started on 26 December (St. Stephen's Day/ Hunt the Wren Day) and was only played by men (of all ages) during the winter. In modern times, an annual match of cammag is played in St John's on 26 December in keeping with this tradition.

== History ==
The Manx word cammag, as in modern Scottish Gaelic camanachd and Irish camán, is derived from the Gaelic root word cam, meaning bent. The sport may have been introduced to the Isle of Man by Irish missionaries in the fifth century. The earliest written record of the game dates to 1760, when three men and a boy were brought before the church court for playing cammag on a Sunday. References to cammag in the press first appear in 1843, when an attempt to ban the sport from being played within towns was reported by the Manx Sun. Further complaints about the playing of cammag were reported in 1846, 1851, 1869, 1871, and 1884. It appears that the sport was mainly played in an unorganised fashion by young boys during this period. However, on 14 March 1885 the Isle of Man Times reported that the "ancient game of Cammag" had been "revived" at Mooragh, Ramsey. During the rest of 1885, there were numerous reports of cammag being played in Ramsey and by December, the Ramsey Cammag Club had been formed. The club appears to have lapsed during 1886 but in October 1890, the Ramsey Courier reported that the club was being revived although it is unclear if this happened. In 1895, a letter to the Isle of Man Examiner reported that a cammag club was to be established in the village of Foxdale, but it is also unknown what became of this. Between 1894 and 1901, cammag was also played during the winter at the Isle of Man Lunatic Asylum.

Cammag was gradually supplanted by hockey and hockey clubs were formed across the island in the early years of the twentieth century. However, games of cammag were played again in 1937 as part of Hollantide Night festivities held by Aeglagh Vannin. In July 1938, a camogie exhibition match was played in Noble's Park, Douglas as part of the Celtic Congress being held on the island. The match drew comparisons with cammag in the press. In 1979, a composite rules shinty–hurling international match between Scotland and Ireland was played at Port-e-Chee, Douglas, as part of the island's millennium celebrations. Ireland won 7-3.

== Recent matches ==
An open Cammag match is played on Hunt the Wren Day (26 December) on the Tynwald field at St John's. Matches are held between the North and the South of the island. Research by David Fisher in the archives of Manx National Heritage clarified that the Northern line historically ran from the Grand Island Hotel to Niarbyl, south of Peel. The game usually starts at 2 p.m., and is played over three 20-minute periods.

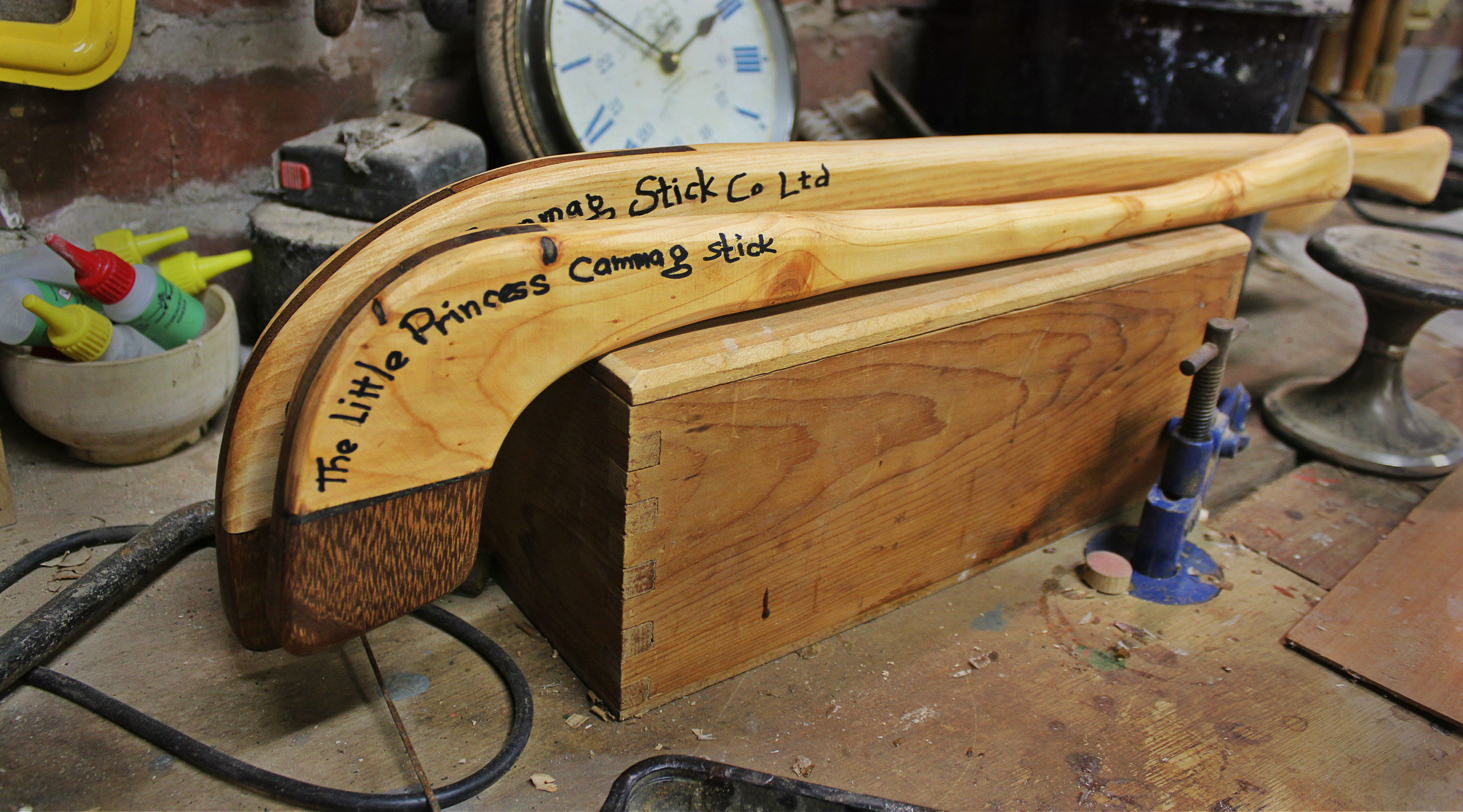
Cammag sticks made by David Fisher in 2016

Teams are informal and unregulated, often numbering more than 50 people (both males and females) on the field – historic commentary cites matches played with anywhere between four and two hundred players. During the early 2000s, the match was refereed by the late local radio presenter John Kaneen. Playing equipment is supposed to consist of a bent stick, though there are many variations on the design. The game is a physically demanding contact sport, and protective equipment is advised.

The game usually revolves around a central pack, where a large number of players are confined in a small space, and the ball cannot move large distances. Breakout attacks down the open wings occasionally take place, though the large number of players in the centre of the field makes it difficult to attack the staked-out goals from outside positions.

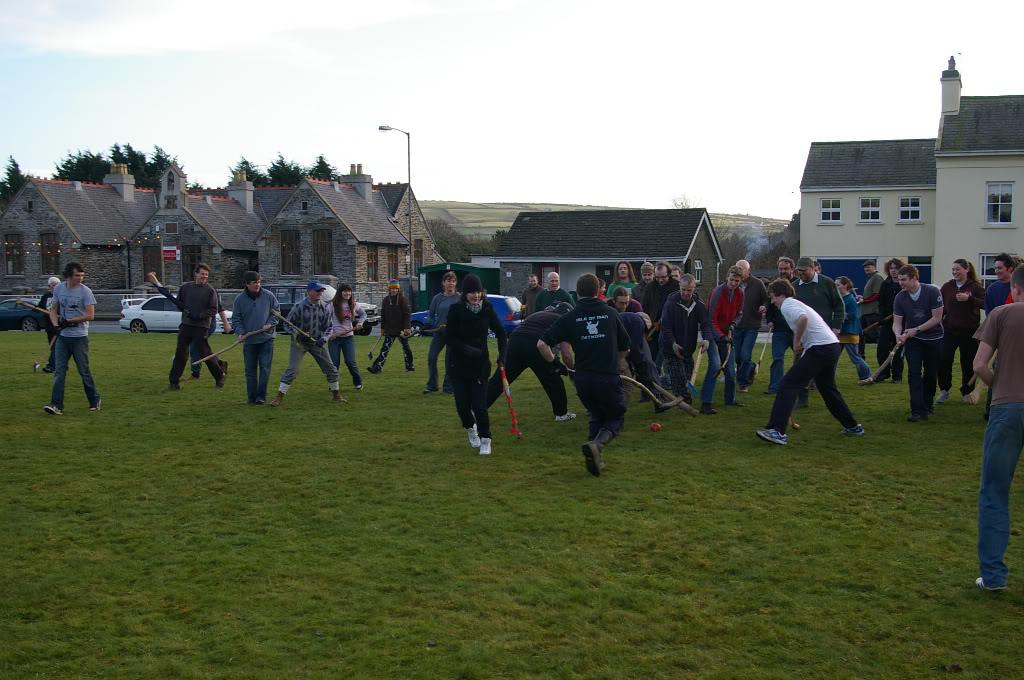
The 2009 Cammag match at St John's

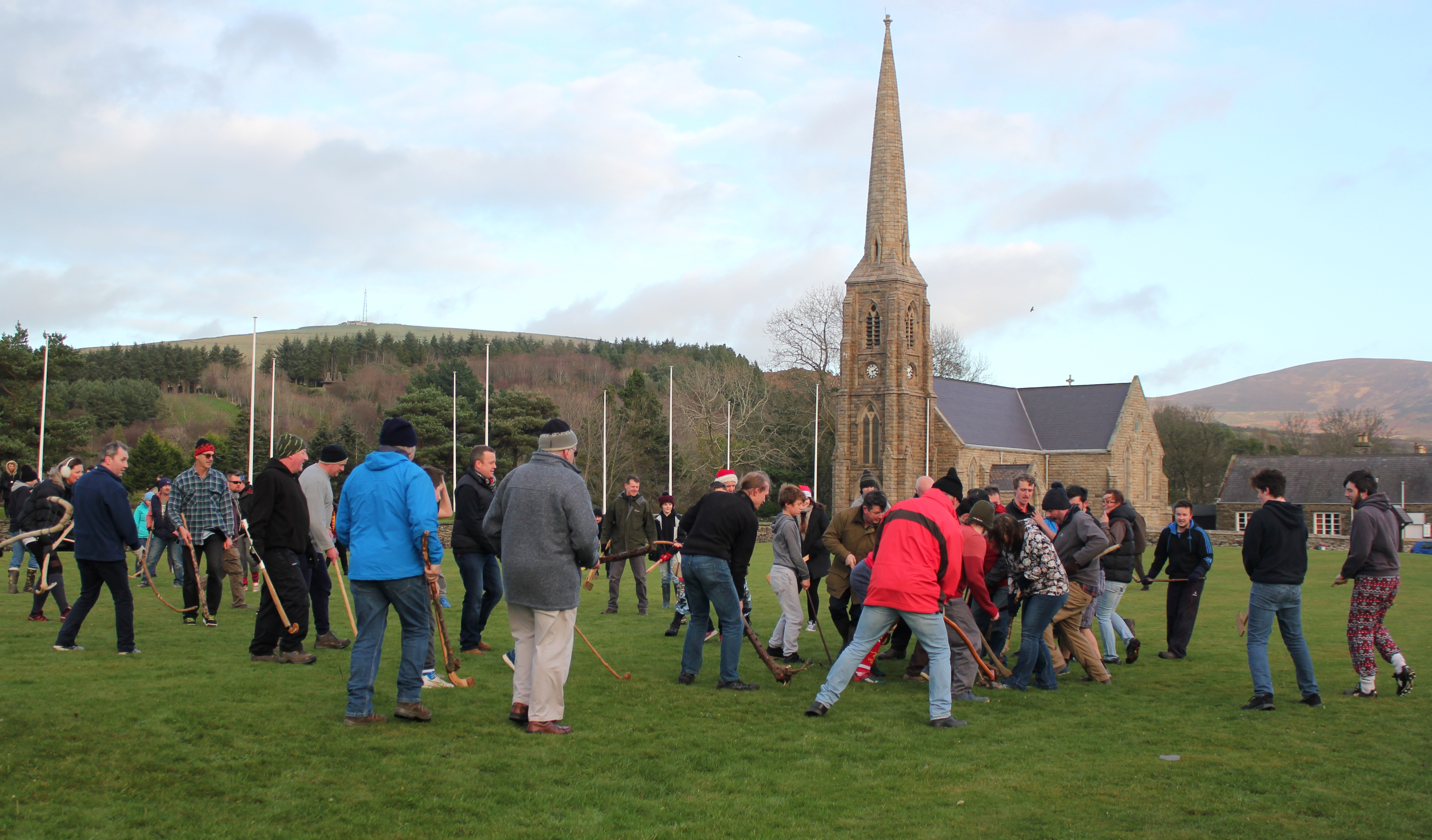
The 2016 Cammag match at St. John's

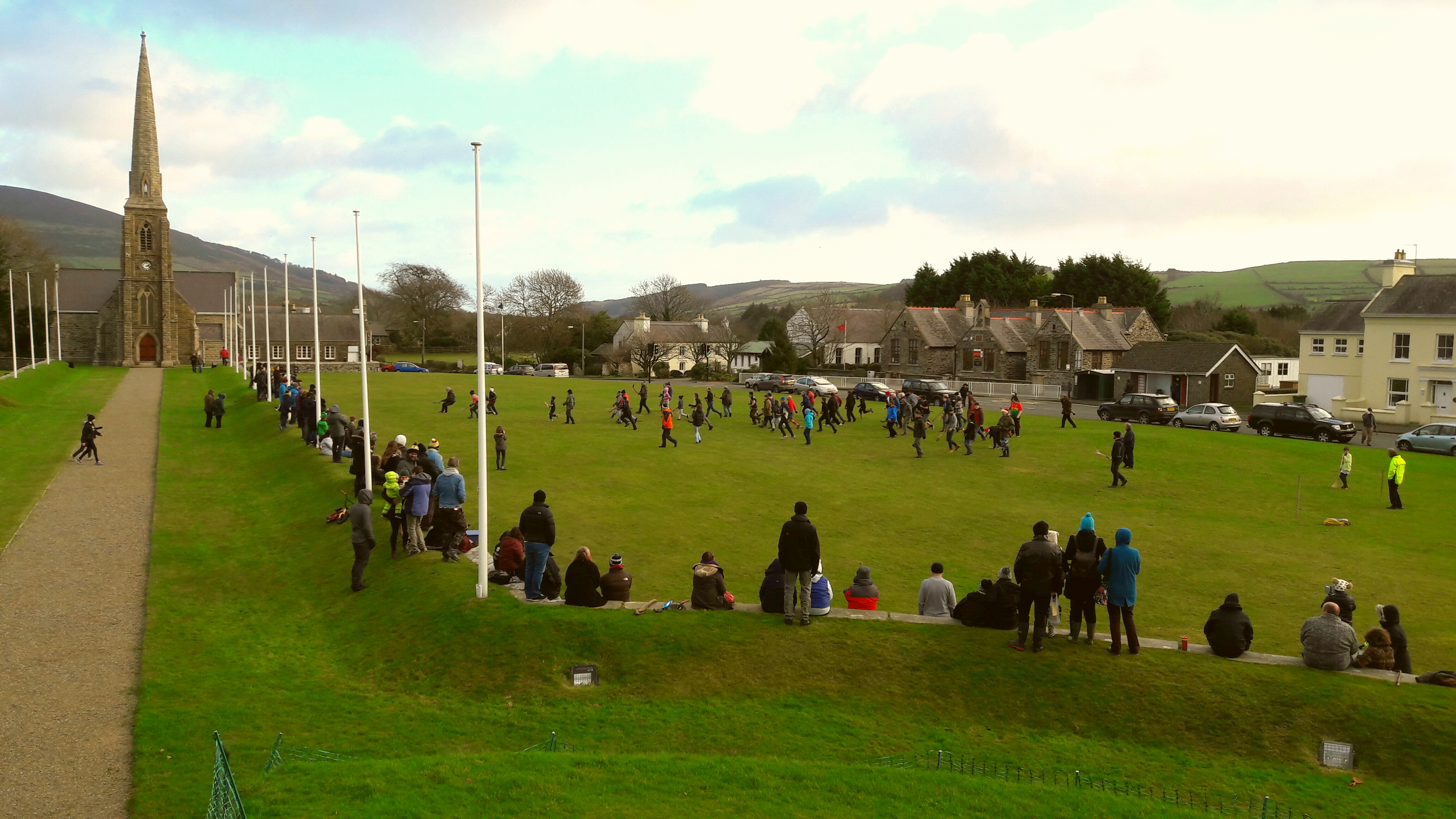
The 2016 Cammag match at St. Johns

St John's matches from 2005
Year	Score (North–South)	Notes
2005	4–2	Despite being heavily outnumbered by a Southern side that included Peel for the second time. The North managed to control the game by holding the ball in the centre pack (where a relatively small number of players have access to the ball), and playing a solid defensive game. Scorers for the North were David Fisher (2), Ean Radcliffe and Roy Kennaugh.
2006	4–4	The North came back from a 4–2 deficit at the end of the second period to draw the match level. Referee John Kaneen decided that the South should hold the cup until the 2007 match.
2007	1–5	
2008	5–4	The North closed a 4–1 deficit in the final third of the match to draw level at full-time, then scored in the sudden death period to win the match. Scorers for the North included Ean Radcliffe (pushover goal), Rob Teare, Paul Rogers and Jole Fisher (2 goals).
2009	4–3	The South led by 2–0 at the end of the first period, but failed to hold on to their lead. At the end of the final period, the match was drawn at 3–3, and it went to extra time. The North scored to win the match 4–3. The match was an intensely physical game that included many ground mauls.
2010	2–3	The game was refereed by David Fisher, John Kaneen and Stewart Bennett. The match was dominated by a much larger southern side, including four goalkeepers at one point, but the North held on for a 2–2 draw at the end of the third period. Scorers for the North were Jole Fisher and Ean Radcliffe, whilst well known player John "Dog" Collister kept goal. The match went to sudden death, which was won by the South who massed for a pushover goal.
2011	0–3	The southern side held the majority of possession, and the South's much larger numbers meant that the northern side was on the defensive for much of the match.
2012	9–4	A landslide victory for the North, the largest score in recent memory. Heavy rain meant challenging conditions, but the sides were evenly matched for most of the game, and until the third period the score remained at 4–4. The North secured victory with a 5-goal streak in the last period. Scorers for the North included Oli Trainor and Ean Radcliffe (3).
2013	(2–3)	2 Southern goals in doubt. The match was once again mired in controversy as scoring was disputed, a common thing in Cammag matches – although the South put three goals over the line to the North's two, referee Paul Callister ruled that it was unclear whether an early goal for the South should have been allowed due to being too high over the keeper, and that a late goal for the South had been kicked over the line, which would be disqualified as all scoring has to be with the stick. Scorers for the North were John Faragher and Ean Radcliffe, in the face of superb goalkeeping from the South which denied the North another overwhelming victory. After the one-sided victory by the North in the 2012 match, it was decided that the South should hold the cup for the year.
2014	1–3	
2015	7–1	The number of players was much reduced due to heavy rain, though the sides were relatively even in numbers for the first time in many years. The skillful North led from early in the match, with the South scoring a consolation goal late in the third period. Scorers for the North included David Fisher, who was also refereeing the match.
2016	5–1	
2017	6–1	The North dominated despite superb goalkeeping from Southern keeper Ryan Davies, who was awarded the "Man of the Match" award. The match was the swansong of popular North player and great Manxman Roy Kennaugh, who died on 27 December 2017.
2018	3–5	
2019	3–4	
2020	4–2	
2021	2–3	
2025	1–10	
