= Hugh Dan MacLennan =

Scottish broadcaster, author and sporting academic

Hugh Dan MacLennan (Scottish Gaelic: Ùisdean MacIllFhinnein) is a Scottish broadcaster, author and sporting academic with specific interest in the sport of shinty. A fluent Gaelic speaker from Lochaber, he attended the University of Glasgow before going on to teach Gaelic in Millburn Academy, Inverness (later becoming Principal Teacher) and then going to work with BBC Radio nan Gaidheal. He has been Secretary of the Gaelic Society of Inverness and both director and vice president of the Camanachd Association and was director of communications for Caledonian MacBrayne. In 1998 was awarded a PhD by the University of Aberdeen. McLennan is chief presenter and co-hosts the quiz show on Aibisidh on BBC Alba with Mary Anne McDonald. MacLennan has made several guest appearances on BBC Scotland programmes on life in the Scotland.

He has written several books and papers on the subject of shinty. He also played the game himself, appearing for Fort William and the Glasgow University Shinty Club.

== Commentary ==
MacLennan also commentates on Pro14 rugby matches on BBC Alba and many non-Gaelic speakers often comment on his near legendary performances such is the excitement and passion he brings to the sport, particularly when commenting on the play of Glasgow Warriors Fijian Scrum Half Niko Matawalu. Since 2012 MacLennan has presented Aibisidh, a quiz show on BBC Alba.

== Bibliography ==
- Not an Orchid
- Shinty!
