= Hailes (ball game) =

Scottish sport

Hailes or clacken is a Scottish ball game which dates to the 18th century and achieved its widest popularity in the nineteenth. It has now virtually died out, replaced by football, except at The Edinburgh Academy, where an exhibition match is played annually. The game is similar to shinty but played with wooden bats known as clackens.

== The Clacken ==
John Hugh Lockhart at Abbotsford with clacken and ball

The clacken, or clackan, is described in the Scottish National Dictionary as "a wooden hand-bat or racquet used by boys at The Edinburgh Academy and Royal High School". It is derived from the Scots word cleckinbrod, derived in turn from brod, a board and the onomatopoeic word cleck or clack, the noise made by the clapper in a mill. In August 1821, Blackwood's Magazine carried an article about traditional games: "The games among the children of Edinburgh have their periodic returns. At one time nothing is to be seen in the hands of boys but cleckenbrods."

The picture on the right, which appeared as the frontispiece to an 1829 edition of Walter Scott's Tales of a Grandfather shows Scott's grandson, John Hugh Lockhart with a clacken and ball at Abbotsford. This is probably the oldest representation of the clacken.

The design of the clacken, as described in the Encyclopaedia of Sport in 1898 as "a piece of wood about 18 inches long and has a head about 4 inches wide and ½ inch thick; just short of the head, the bat is thinned down to about ¼ inch from back to front, and again the head is thinned off towards the tip to make it easier to raise the ball from the ground."

The clacken was used in the game of Hailes, though it had other uses. "All would be armed with clackans, wooden bats suitable for playing shinty, or hails or hitting other boys' heads" (from E. S. Haldane's Scotland of our Fathers, 1933). In recent years it survives only at the Edinburgh Academy, where it is used in an annual Hailes match of the Ephors versus the Leavers (or non-Ephors) and in athletics where they run a clacken-and-ball race. Until the 1960s, it was still used in the Junior School for playing Hailes and also in the Senior School by the Ephors as a means of delivering corporal punishment.

== History ==
In the 18th and 19th centuries, hails referred to the goals in several varieties of hand- and football. Games such as hail-ba' and hand' an' hail were played in various parts of Scotland. The latter was a game common in Dumfriesshire. According to Jamieson, "two hails, or dules, are fixed on, at about the distance of four hundred yards from each other, or as much farther as the players can agree on. The two parties then place themselves in the middle between the two goals, or dules, and one of the persons, taking a soft elastic ball about the size of a man's fist, tosses it into the air and as it falls strikes it with his palm towards his antagonists. The object of the game is for either party to drive the ball beyond the goal which lies before them, while their opponents do all in their power to prevent this."

In his poems of 1804, W. Tarras tells in verse of such a game:

The hails are set an' on they scud
...

and

The hails is wun; they warsle hame
The best they can for fobbin'

The game just about died out during the 19th century with the rise in interest in football. It is known to have survived only in the Royal High School and the Edinburgh Academy.

In James Trotter's book on the Royal High School, published in 1911, the game is referred to as "the distinctively school game of Clacken, now alas extinct! Less than thirty years ago [i.e. in the 1880s] no High School boy considered his equipment complete unless the wooden clacken hung to his wrist as he went and came".

Though it was played in the Junior School of the Edinburgh Academy until the late 1960s, it had by then long since died out in the Senior School as a regular activity. However, as part of the centenary celebrations of the school in 1924, the Seventh year took on the Ephors in an exhibition match and this is now an annual event occurring on the last Wednesday or Tuesday of the Summer Term and is now quite a spectacle which the whole school turns out to watch.

== Rules ==
Unlike games that have now become regulated, the rules of Hailes were loosely applied and varied from town to town. The original game had no goals as we know them today but a dule or hails-line that ran the full width of the playing area. A hail was scored by driving the ball over that line. When it was played with clackens, the ball could be carried on the clacken.

Old records suggest that when the dules were fixed at a great distance apart (400 m or so), the winning team was the one that scored the first hail. After that, the game was over. Numbers playing on each team were not fixed and varied from place to place. It may have been that there was not even a requirement for the same number to play in each team.

Copies of The Edinburgh Academy Chronicle suggest that the rules of the game have changed over the years as well. Players made up rules to suit the environment. In one case, the 'goal' was a flat surface upon which the ball had to be slammed downwards using the clacken. In the Junior School version, goals similar to hockey goals were set up, though without a cross bar. In some cases, these could simply be a pile of coats. In these versions, due to the relatively short distance between the goals, a score would be kept.

The game as it is now is played annually and uses the entire school front yards. The goals now comprise two white poles set about 10 ft apart and there is a set at either end of the yards; the tennis ball simply has to pass between the two poles for a team to score a point and whoever has the most points at the end wins the games. The games has two halves of about 10 minutes each. As it is a 'celebrity' (sixth and seventh-year leavers only) game, there is a lot of off-the-ball fun as well. All players wear fancy dress and the use of water pistols and water balloons is not ruled out.

== Sources ==
- Blackwood's Magazine, August 1821, p. 34.
- Haldane, E. S. (1933), Scotland of our Fathers
- Jamieson, John (1880), An Etymological Dictionary of the Scottish Language, Alexander Gardner, Paisley.
- Magnusson, Magnus (1974), The Clacken and the Slate, Collins, London.
- Scottish National Dictionary (1952)
- Tarras, W. (1805), Poems
- Trotter, James (1911), The Royal High School, Edinburgh, Pitman & Sons, London.
