= New Hampshire Wolves Hurling Club =

- Founded: 2006
- County: North American
- Division: Northeast Division GAA Board
- Colours: Navy blue, granite grey and white
- Grounds: Merrimack NH, The Anheuser-Busch Sports Fields

The New Hampshire Wolves Hurling Club, also called the Barley House Wolves, is an American hurling club based in New Hampshire. The team was founded in 2006 by New Hampshire Army National Guard soldiers from Charlie Company, 3rd Battalion of the 172nd Mountain Infantry. They are New Hampshire's first hurling club consisting solely of American-born players, as opposed to clubs formed with Irish or other expatriates. The club competes at Junior C and Junior B levels.

== History ==
In 2005, a troop transport with National Guard soldiers coming from Iraq stopped in Shannon to refuel. The players saw hurling being played on the television screen at the airport bar, and were inspired to start their own team.

The Wolves were the subject of a 2011 Pentagon Channel documentary Two Fields One Team, broadcast to U.S. military networks around the world. In 2017, the Wolves were featured on WMUR-TV's NH Chronicle segment.

== Overview ==
The club aims to develop American players who are new to the sport. The club maintains a youth program and also supports the Camogie community, and is funded by the players and sponsors. While the traveling Wolves Hurling Club plays games among the six teams within the Boston GAA, there are coed club teams which compete in weekly local matches. The traveling team is made up of players who also play on the coed club teams. In 2011, the New Hampshire Wolves Hurling Club team captured its first Northeast Junior C Championship. In 2012 the hurling club went on to win the USGAA Junior C National Title.

US teams play with 13 players, while Ireland teams field 15 players.

== Honors ==
- USGAA National Junior C (1): 2012 (runner-up in 2019)
- USGAA National Junior B (0): (runner-up in 2014 and 2018)
- USGAA Northeast Junior C (3): 2012, 2016, 2018
