= Hurling =

Outdoor team stick and ball game

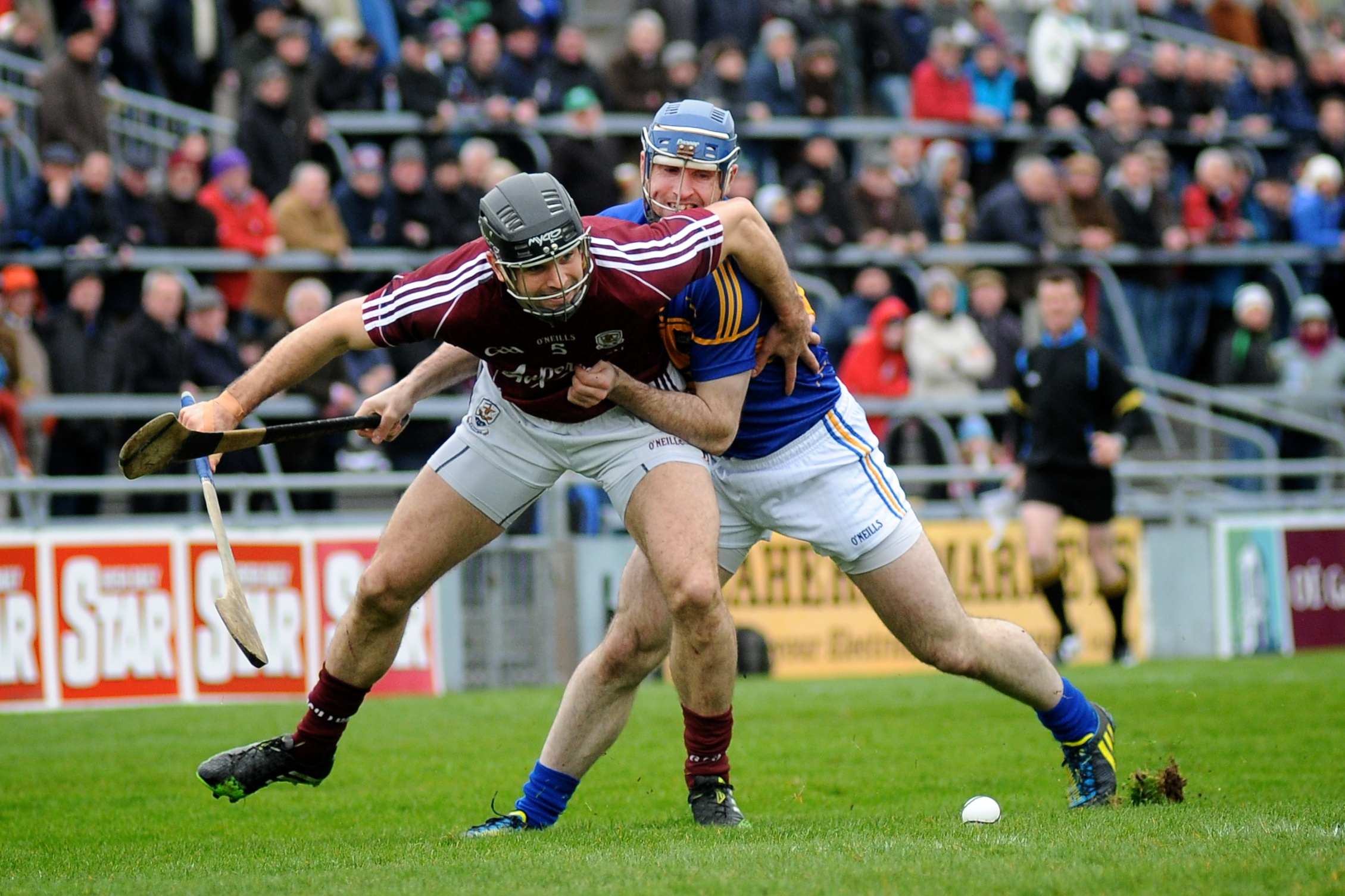
- David Collins of Galway holds off Tipperary's Eoin Kelly in the 2014 National Hurling League
- Highest governing body: Gaelic Athletic Association
- First played: Pre-medieval origins; first codified match played 27 January 1883 in Dublin, Ireland

Characteristics
- Contact: Yes
- Team members: 26 (15 and 11 substitutes)
- Mixed-sex: Camogie is the female variant
- Equipment: Sliotar, hurley, helmet

Presence
- Olympic: Demonstration sport 1904
- Paralympic: No

Hurling
- UNESCO Intangible Cultural Heritage
- Country: Ireland
- Reference: 01263
- Region: Europe and North America

Inscription history
- Inscription: 2 (13th session)
- List: Representative

Hurling (Irish: iománaíocht, iomáint) is an outdoor team game of ancient Gaelic Irish origin. When played by women, it is called camogie (camógaíocht), which shares a common Gaelic root. One of Ireland's native Gaelic games, it shares a number of features with Gaelic football, such as the field and goals, the number of players and much terminology.

The objective of the game is for players to use an ash wood stick called a hurl or hurley (in Irish a camán, pronounced /ˈkæmən/ or /kəˈmɔːn/ in English) to hit a small ball called a sliotar (pronounced /ˈʃlɪtər/ in English) between the opponent's goalposts either over the crossbar for one point or under the crossbar into a net guarded by a goalkeeper for three points. The sliotar can be caught in the hand and carried for not more than four steps, struck in the air or struck on the ground with the hurley. It can be kicked, or slapped with an open hand (the hand pass), for short-range passing. A player who wants to carry the ball for more than four steps has to bounce or balance the sliotar on the end of the stick (solo), and the ball can be handled only twice while in the player's possession. Provided that a player has at least one foot on the ground, he may make a shoulder-to-shoulder charge on an opponent who is in possession of the ball or is playing the ball, or when both players are moving in the direction of the ball. No protective padding is worn by players though a plastic protective helmet with a faceguard has been mandatory for all age groups since 2010.

Early forms of hurling have been played since at least the Middle Ages, with the earliest written references appearing in Irish law tracts from the seventh century. The earliest archaeological evidence dates from the twelfth-century. The first written rules for hurling were published in January 1883 by the Dublin Hurling Club.

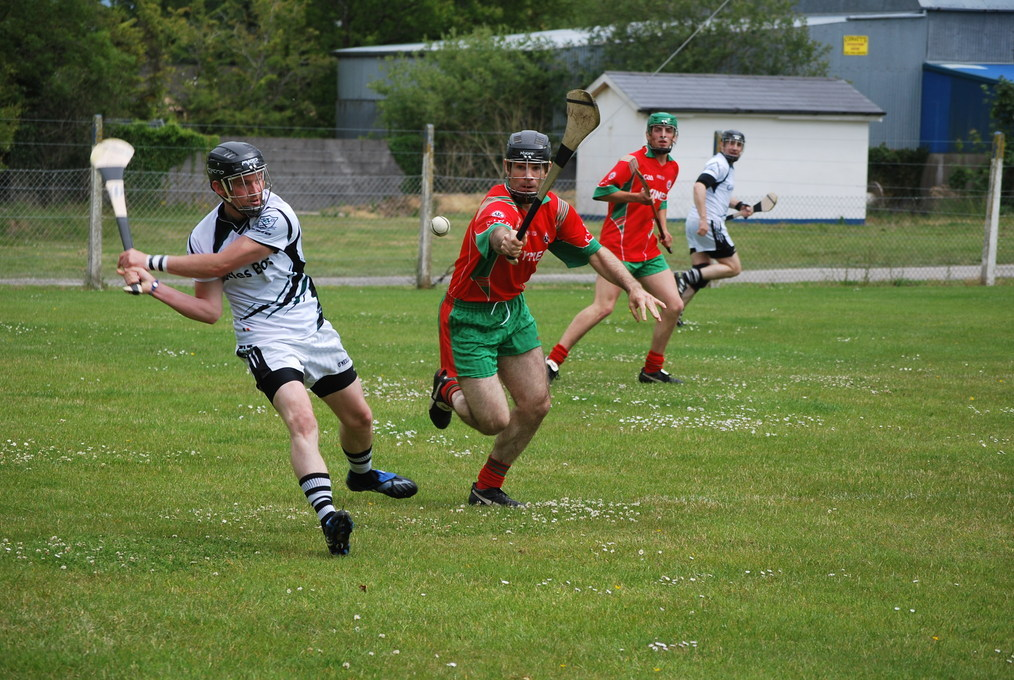
A club hurling match in play

Hurling is today administered by the Gaelic Athletic Association (GAA). It has featured regularly in art forms such as film, music and literature. The final of the All-Ireland Senior Hurling Championship was listed in second place by CNN in its "10 sporting events you have to see live", after the Olympic Games and ahead of both the FIFA World Cup and UEFA European Championship. Financial Times columnist Simon Kuper wrote after the 2020 All-Ireland Senior Hurling Championship final that hurling was "the best sport ever and if the Irish had colonised the world, nobody would ever have heard of football". UNESCO lists hurling as an element of intangible cultural heritage. A 2024 survey found that hurling was the favourite sport of 25% of Irish people.

== Statistics ==
- A team comprises 15 players, or "hurlers"
- The hurley/hurl is generally 24 to 36 inches (61 to 91 cm) in length
- The ball, known as a sliotar, has a cork centre and a leather cover; it is between 69 and 72 mm (2.7 and 2.8 in) in diameter, and weighs between 110 and 120 g (3.9 and 4.2 oz); traditionally white in colour, in recent years the GAA has mandated use of an "optic yellow" sliotar at higher levels for easier visibility
- The goalkeeper's hurley/hurl usually has a bas (the flattened, curved end) twice the size of other players' hurleys to provide some advantage against the fast moving sliotar
- A good strike with a hurley/hurl can propel the ball over 150 km/h (93 mph) in speed and 110 metres (361 ft) in distance.
- A ball hit over the bar is worth one point. A ball that is hit under the bar is called a goal and is worth three points.
- As of 2010, all players must wear a suitable helmet.

== Rules ==
=== Playing field ===
Hurling pitch

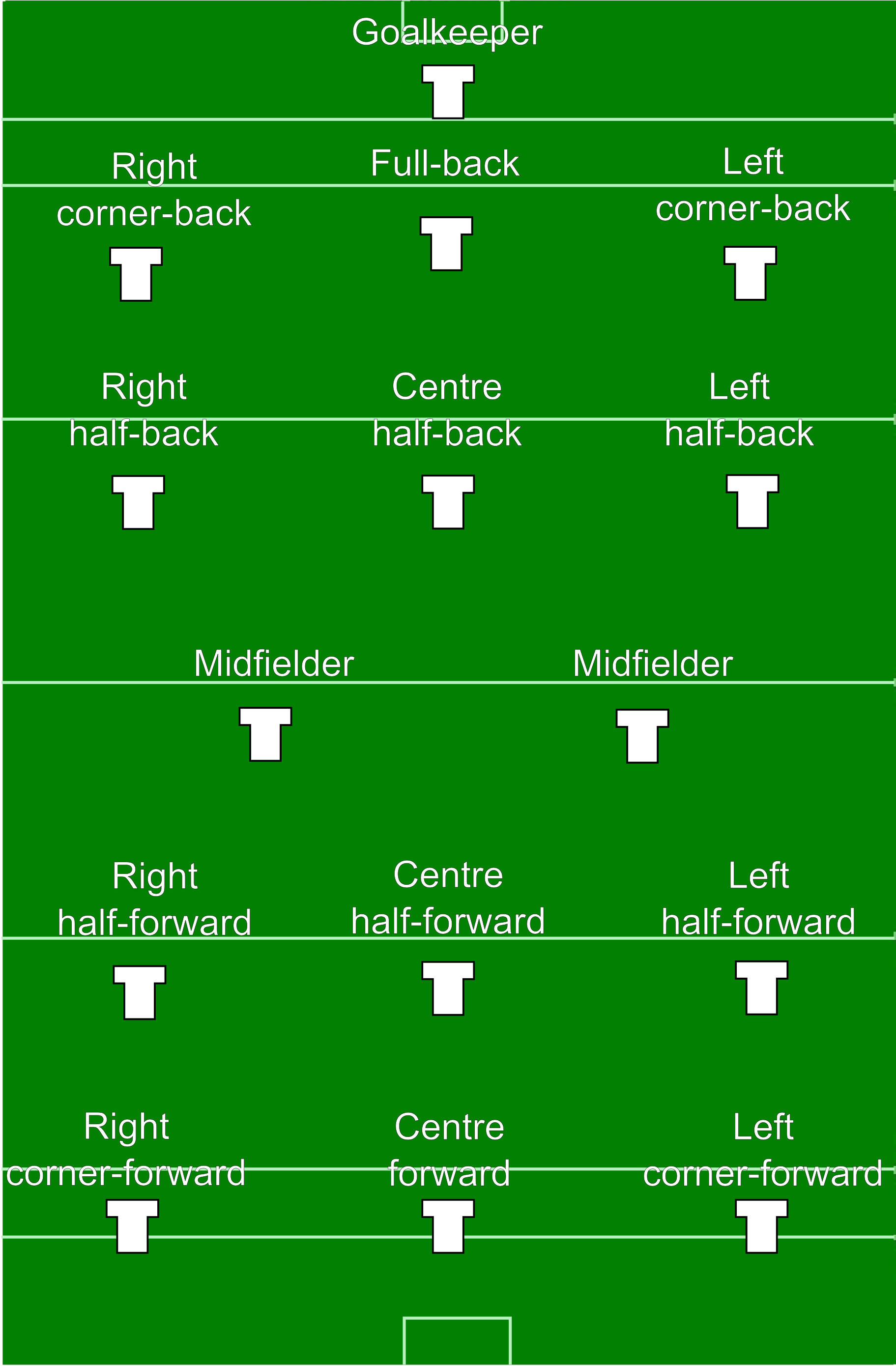
Positions on field

A hurling pitch is similar in some respects to a rugby pitch but larger. The grass pitch is rectangular, stretching 130–145 metres (140–160 yards) long and 80–90 m (90–100 yd) wide. There are H-shaped goalposts at each end, formed by two posts, which are usually 6–7 metres (20–23 feet) high, set 6.5 m (21 ft) apart, and connected 2.5 m (8.2 ft) above the ground by a crossbar. A net extending behind the goal is attached to the crossbar and lower goal posts.

The same pitch is used for Gaelic football; the GAA, which organises both sports, decided this to facilitate dual usage. Lines are marked at distances of 13 metres, 20 metres and 59 metres (41 metres for Gaelic football) from each end-line. Shorter pitches and smaller goals are used by youth teams.

=== Teams ===
Teams consist of fifteen players: a goalkeeper, three full backs, three half backs, two midfielders, three half forwards and three full forwards (see diagram). The panel is made up of 24–30 players and five substitutions are allowed per game. An exception can now be made in the case of a blood substitute being necessary. Blood substitutes are a result of one player needing medical treatment for a laceration and another coming on as a temporary replacement while the injured player is tended to.

=== Helmets ===
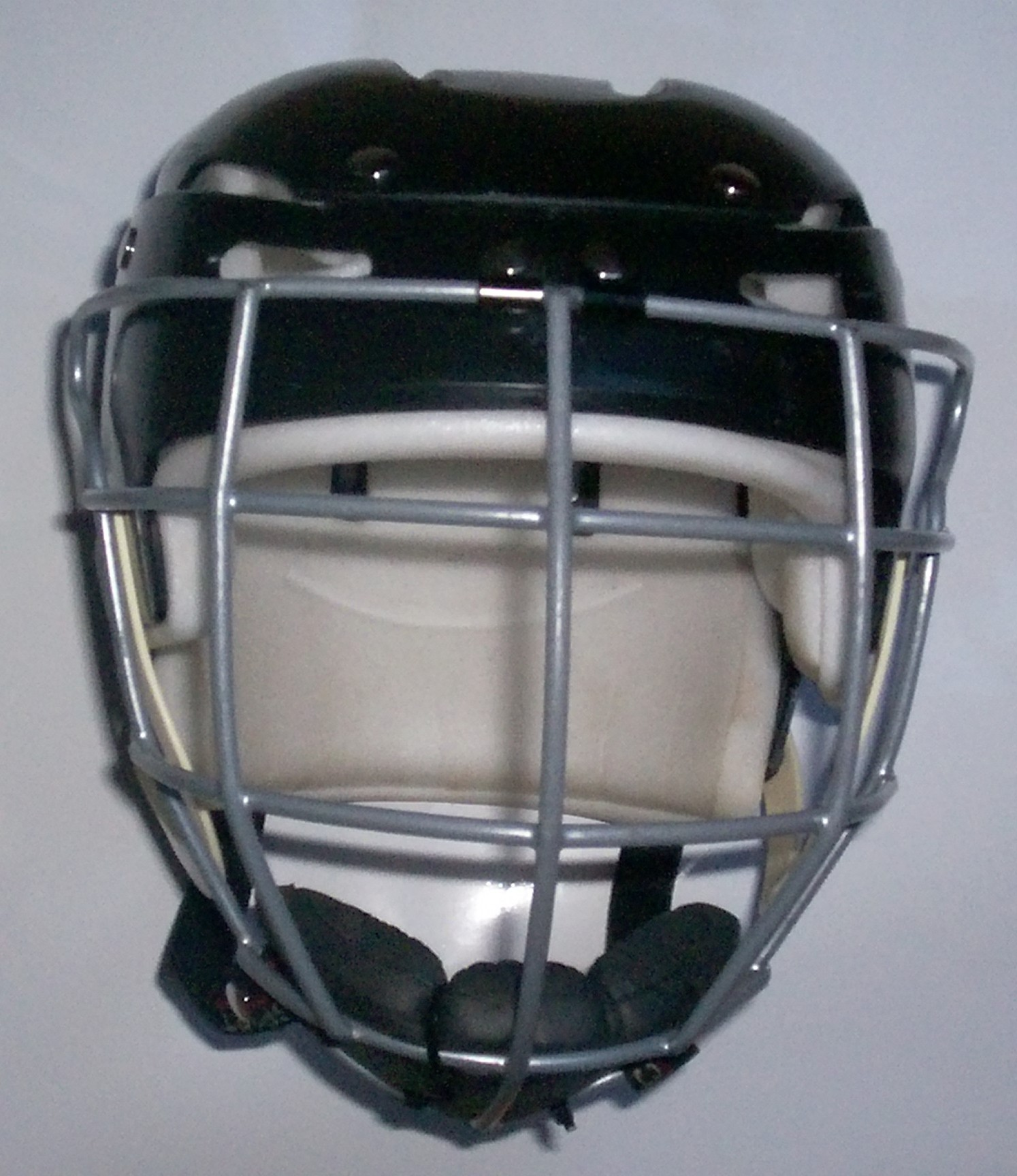
A standard hurling helmet

From 1 January 2010, the wearing of helmets became compulsory for hurlers at all levels because too many players were recording notes of permanent brain damage after playing for too long. A standard hurling helmet is a helmet designed specially for the games of hurling and camogie. It consists of a plastic rigid shell, lined with foam cushioning, which covers the forehead, temples, crown of the head and down to the nape of the neck. A wire grille faceguard covers the whole face and is secured by straps that clip at the back of the head. This saw senior players follow the regulations already introduced in 2009 at minor and under 21 grades.

The GAA hopes to significantly reduce the number of injuries by introducing the compulsory wearing of helmets with full faceguards, both in training and matches. Hurlers of all ages, including those at nursery clubs when holding a hurley in their hand, must wear a helmet and faceguard at all times. Match officials will be obliged to stop play if any player at any level appears on the field of play without the necessary standard of equipment.

=== Duration, extra time, replays ===
Senior inter-county matches last 70 minutes (35 minutes per half). All other matches last 60 minutes (30 minutes per half). For teams under-13 and lower, games may be shortened to 50 minutes. Timekeeping is at the discretion of the referee who adds on stoppage time at the end of each half. In 2020, water breaks were brought in after the first 15 minutes in each half.

There are various solutions for knockout games that end in a draw, such as a replay, or what the rules refer to as "Winner on the Day" measures such as extra time (20 minutes), further extra time (10 more minutes), or a shoot-out. The application and details of these measures vary according to the importance of the match and the difficulty of scheduling possible replays, and can change from year to year. The general trend is that the GAA have been trying to reduce the need for replays, to ease scheduling.

=== Technical fouls ===
The following are considered technical fouls ("fouling the ball"):

- Picking the ball directly off the ground (instead it must be flicked up with the hurley)
- Throwing the ball (instead it must be "hand-passed": slapped with the open hand)
- Going more than four steps with the ball in the hand (it may be carried indefinitely on the hurley)
- Catching the ball three times in a row without it touching the ground (touching the hurley does not count)
- Putting the ball from one hand to the other
- Hand-passing a goal
- "Chopping" slashing downwards on another player's hurley
- Deliberately dropping the hurley or throwing it away.
- A 'square ball', entering the opponent's small rectangle prior to the ball entering it
- To cover or shield the ball by lying down on it.
- To deliberately throw the ball up and catch it again (the ball must touch a hurley or other body part)
- Carrying the ball over the opponent's goal line

=== Aggressive fouls ===
Can be deliberate or accidental, often accompanied by a card. They are as follows:

- Pulling down an opponent.
- Using the hurl in an uncontrolled or reckless way.
- Tripping an opponent.
- Using threatening or abusive language to an opposing player, to a teammate, or to an official
- Throwing the hurl in a dangerous manner.
- Attempting to strike any player or official with a hurl, elbow, fist, head, or kick.
- Spitting at an opponent.

=== Scoring ===
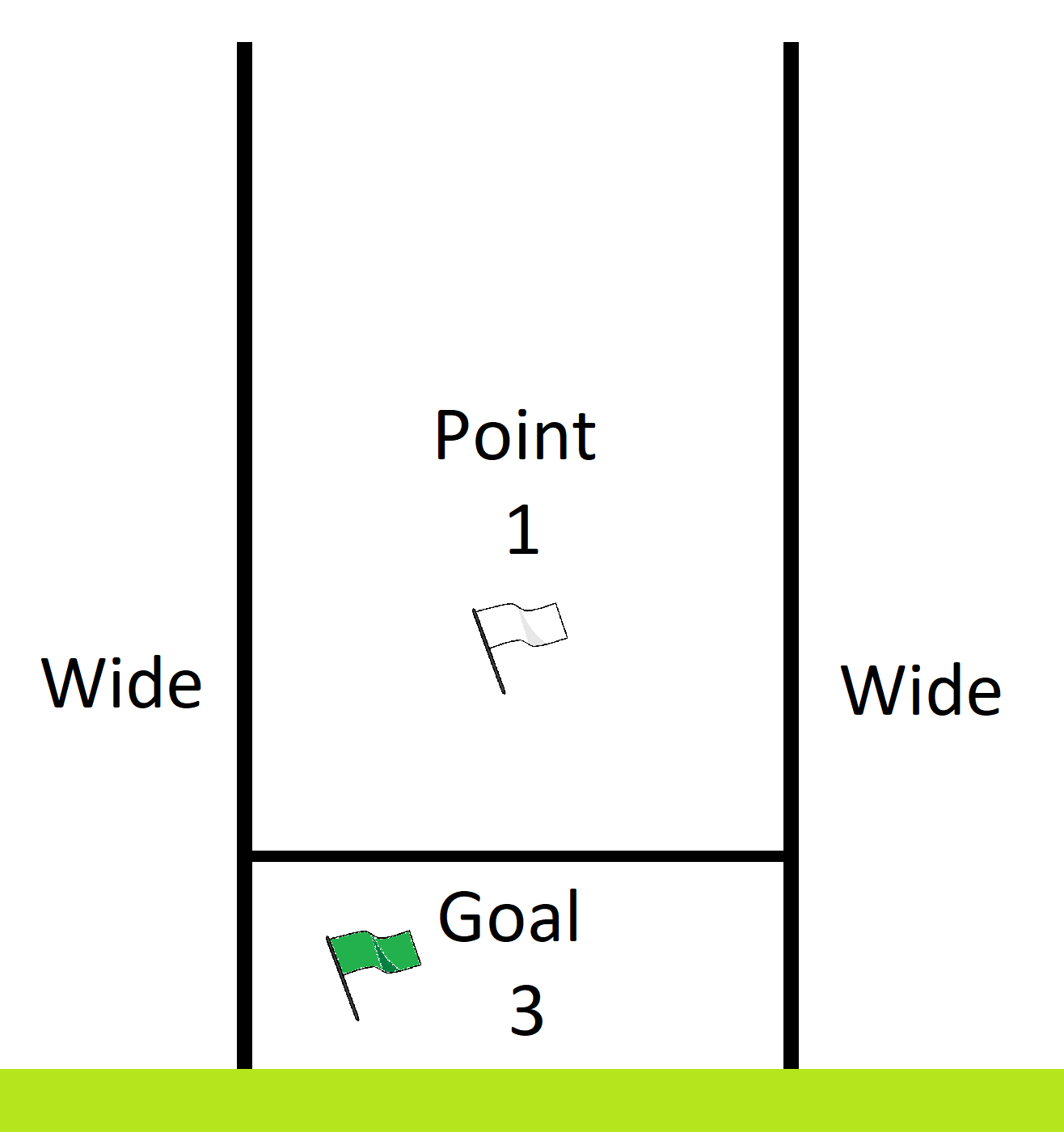
Goalposts and scoring system used in hurling

Scoring is achieved by sending the sliotar between the opposition's goal posts. The posts, which are at each end of the field, are H posts as in rugby football but with a net under the crossbar as in association football. The posts are 6.4 m apart and the crossbar is 2.44 m above the ground.

If the ball goes over the crossbar, a point is scored and a white flag is raised by an umpire. If the ball goes below the crossbar, a goal, worth three points, is scored, and a green flag is raised by an umpire. A goal must be scored by either a striking motion or by directly soloing the ball into the net. The goal is guarded by a goalkeeper. Scores are recorded in the format {goal total} – {point total}. For example, the 1996 All-Ireland final finished: Wexford 1–13 Limerick 0–14. Thus Wexford won by two points (1–13 being worth sixteen points).

=== Tackling ===
Players may be tackled but not struck by a one-handed slash of the stick; exceptions are two-handed jabs and strikes. Jersey-pulling, wrestling, pushing, and tripping are all forbidden. There are several forms of acceptable tackling, the most popular being:

- the "block", where one player attempts to smother an opposing player's strike by trapping the ball between his hurley and the opponent's swinging hurl
- the "hook", where a player approaches another player from a rear angle and attempts to catch the opponent's hurley with his own at the top of the swing
- the "side pull", where two players running together for the sliotar will collide at the shoulders and swing together to win the tackle and "pull" (name given to swing the hurley) with extreme force
- The "shoulder barge" where one player attacks the other player's shoulder by shoving him with the shoulder

=== Restarting play ===
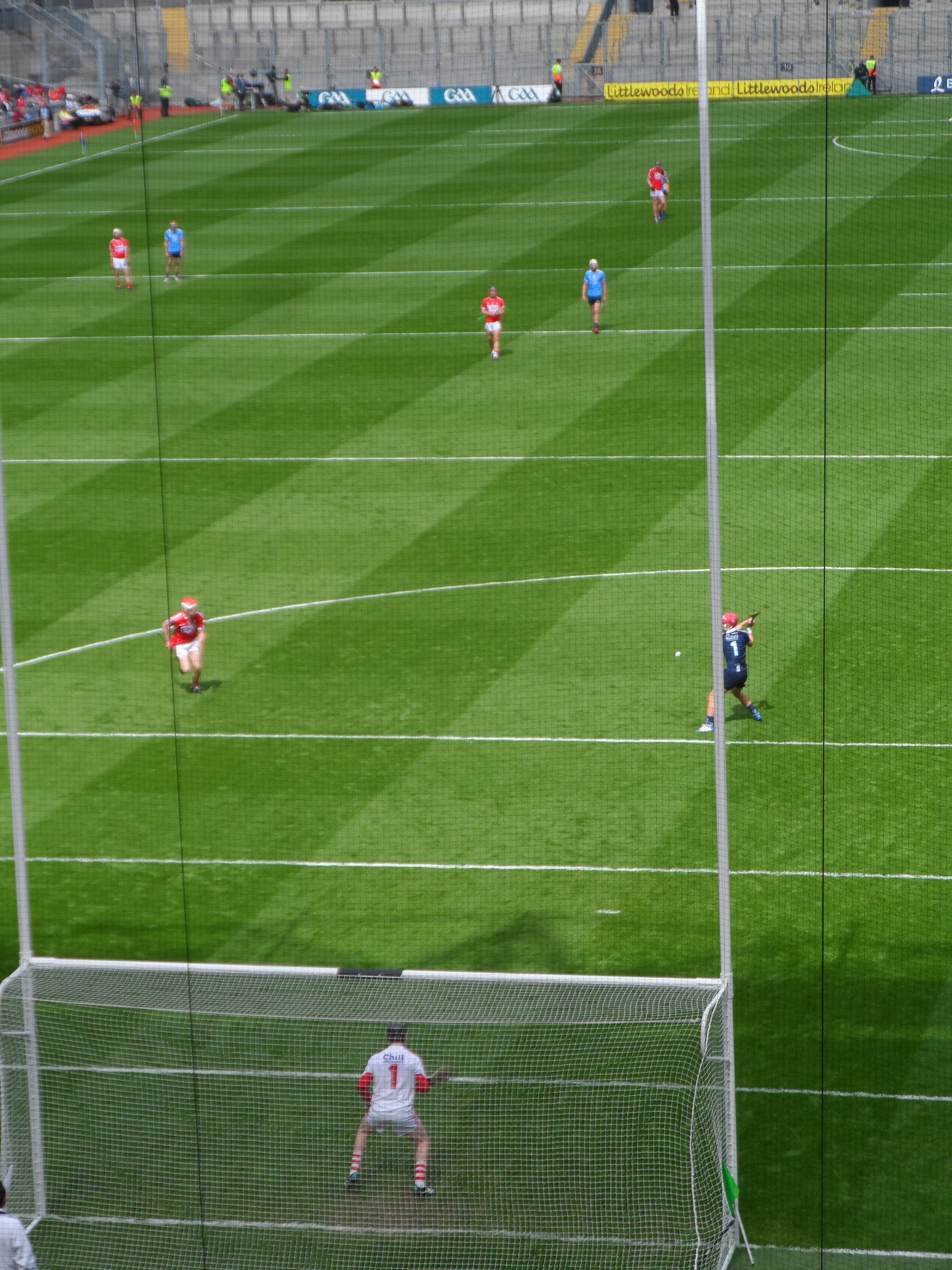
Player taking a penalty puck from the 20-metre line

- The match begins with the referee throwing the sliotar in between the four midfielders on the halfway line
- After an attacker has scored or put the ball wide of the goals, the goalkeeper may take a "puckout" from the hand at the edge of the small square. All players must be beyond the 20 m line.
- After a defender has put the ball wide of the goals, an attacker may take a "65" from the 65 m line level with where the ball went wide. It must be taken by lifting and striking. However, the ball must not be taken into the hand but struck while the ball is lifted.
- After a player has put the ball over the sideline, the other team may take a 'sideline cut' at the point where the ball left the pitch. It must be taken from the ground.
- After a player has committed a foul, the other team may take a 'free' at the point where the foul was committed. It must be taken by lifting and striking in the same style as the "65".
- After a defender has committed a foul inside the square (large rectangle), the other team may take a "penalty" from the ground from behind the 20 m line. Only the goalkeeper may guard the goals. It must be taken by lifting and striking and the sliotar must be struck on or behind the 20m line (The penalty rule was amended in 2015 due to safety concerns. Before this the ball merely had to start at the 20m line but could be struck beyond it. To balance this advantage the two additional defenders previously allowed on the line have been removed).
- If many players are struggling for the ball and no side is able to capitalize or gain control of it the referee may choose to throw the ball in between two opposing players. This is also known as a "throw in".

=== Officials ===
A hurling match is watched over by eight officials:

- The referee (on field)
- Two linesmen (sideline)
- Sideline official/standby linesman (inter-county games only)
- Four umpires (two at each end)
- Hawkeye Video technology for some scoring situations in Croke Park, Dublin and in Semple Stadium in Thurles, Co. Tipperary. (inter-county games only) The referee is responsible for starting and stopping play, recording the score, awarding frees, noting infractions, and issuing yellow (caution) and red (sending off) penalty cards to players after offences. A second yellow card at the same game leads to a red card, and therefore to a dismissal.
Players are cautioned with a yellow card, and dismissed from the game with a red card

Linesmen are responsible for indicating the direction of line balls to the referee and also for conferring with the referee. The fourth official is responsible for overseeing substitutions, and also indicating the amount of stoppage time (signalled to him by the referee) and the players substituted using an electronic board. The umpires are responsible for judging the scoring. They indicate to the referee whether a shot was: wide (spread both arms), a 65 m puck (raise one arm), a point (wave white flag), or a goal (wave green flag).

Contrary to popular belief within the association, all officials are not obliged to indicate "any misdemeanours" to the referee, but are in fact permitted to inform the referee only of violent conduct they have witnessed which has occurred without the referee's knowledge. A linesman or umpire is not permitted to inform the referee of technical fouls such as a "third time in the hand", where a player catches the ball for a third time in succession after soloing or an illegal pick up of the ball. Such decisions can only be made at the discretion of the referee.

== Injury risk ==
Blunt injury to the larynx is an infrequent consequence of contact sports despite protective equipment and stringent rules. Hurling, one of the two national sporting games of Ireland, is seen as one of the fastest field sports on earth and played with only a facemask and helmet as protection, making injury an unavoidable feature of the game without further padding. The two most common sites of injury in hurling are the fingers and the hamstrings. Hurling is also considered to have "a notable proportion of blunt scrotal trauma."

== History ==
=== Early history ===
Forms of stick-and-ball games have been played in Ireland since at least the Early Middle Ages. References to iomáin and báire are found across early Irish law tracts, annals and poetry. The word 'hurling' appears first as 'horlinge' in the 1366 Statute of Kilkenny, which prohibited Gaelic Irish cultural practices in the English colony.

The eighteenth century is frequently referred to as "The Golden Age of Hurling". This was when members of the Anglo-Irish landed gentry kept teams of players on their estates and challenged each other's teams to matches for the amusement of their tenants.

=== First rules ===
The earliest effort to codify the rules was not made until the late nineteenth century, by which time the traditional forms of hurling had all but died out throughout most of country.

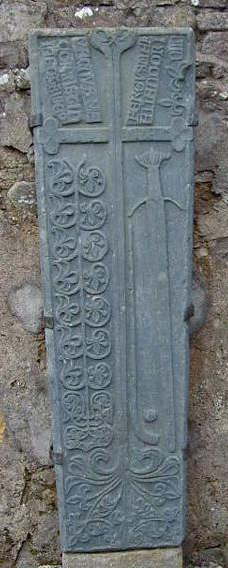
A hurling stick and ball feature on this gallowglass' gravestone, circa 15–16th century

=== Gaelic Athletic Association ===
The founding of the Gaelic Athletic Association (GAA) in 1884 in Hayes Hotel, Thurles, County Tipperary, ended decline by organising the game around a common set of written rules. In 1888, Tipperary represented by Thurles Blues beat Meelick of Galway to win the first All-Ireland Championship. However, the twentieth century saw Cork, Kilkenny as well as Tipperary dominate hurling with each of these counties winning more than 20 All-Ireland titles each. Wexford, Waterford, Clare, Limerick, Offaly, Antrim, Dublin, and Galway were also strong hurling counties during the twentieth century.

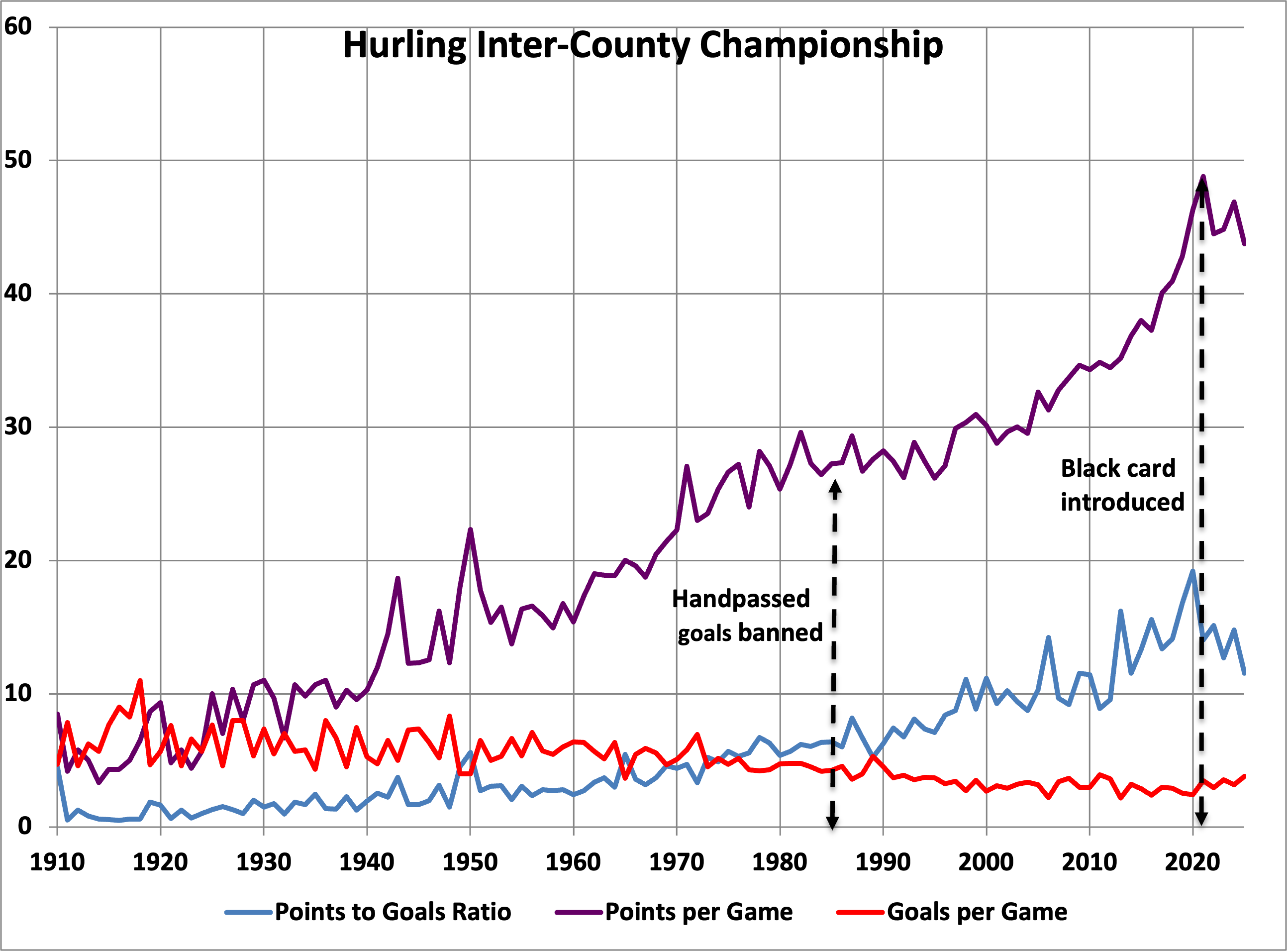
Hurling scoring in All-Ireland championships 1910 to 2026

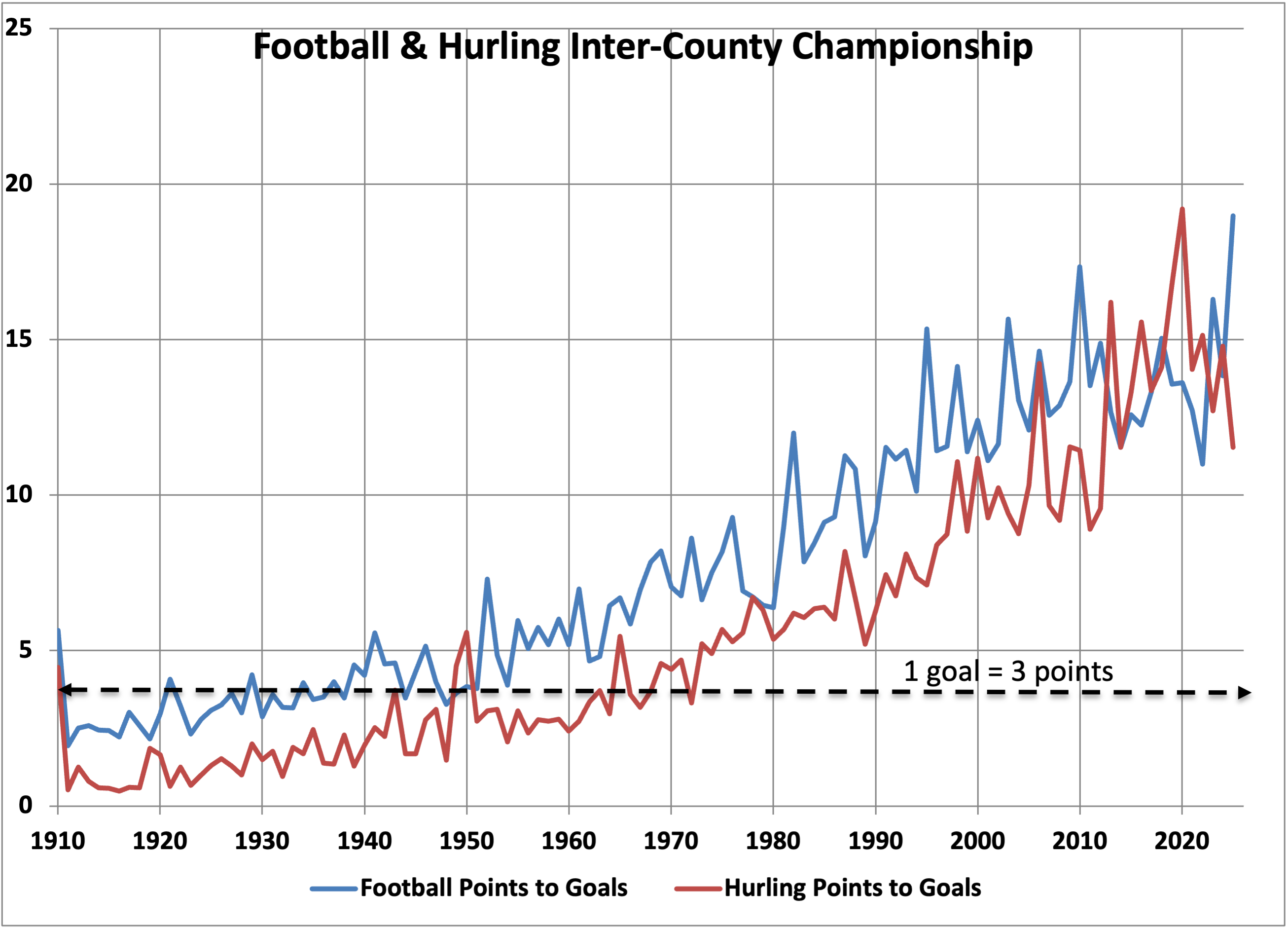
Ratio of points to goals in hurling and football inter-county championships 1910 to 2026

An extended qualifier system resulted in a longer All-Ireland Senior Hurling Championship. Pay-for-play remains controversial and the Gaelic Players Association continues to grow in strength. The inauguration of the Christy Ring Cup and Nicky Rackard Cup gave new championships and an opportunity to play in Croke Park to the weaker county teams. Further dissemination of the championship structure was completed in 2009 with the addition of the Lory Meagher Cup to make it a four tier championship.

== International ==
Although many hurling clubs exist worldwide, only Ireland has a national team (although it includes only players from weaker counties in order to ensure matches are competitive). It and the Scotland shinty team have played for many years with modified match rules (as with International Rules Football). The match is the only such international competition. However, competition at club level has been going on around the world since the late nineteenth century thanks to emigration from Ireland, and the strength of the game has ebbed and flowed along with emigration trends. Nowadays, growth in hurling is noted in Continental Europe, Australia, and North America.

=== Argentina ===
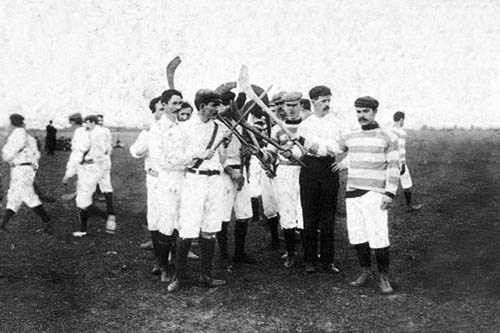
An early hurling team in Argentina, formed by Irish immigrants, c. 1900

Irish immigrants began arriving in Argentina in the 19th century. The earliest reference to hurling in Argentina dates from the late 1880s in Mercedes, Buenos Aires. However, the game was not actively promoted until 1900, when it came to the attention of author and newspaperman William Bulfin. Under Bulfin's patronage, the Hurling Club was formed on 15 July 1900, leading to teams being established in different neighborhoods of Buenos Aires and the surrounding farming communities.

Games of hurling were played every weekend until 1914 and received frequent coverage from Argentina's Spanish language newspapers, such as La Nación. After the outbreak of World War I, it became almost impossible to obtain hurleys from Ireland. An attempt was made to use native Argentine mountain ash, but it proved too heavy and lacking in pliability. Although the game was revived after the end of the war, the golden age of Argentine hurling had passed. World War II finally brought the era to its close.

In the aftermath of the Second World War, immigration from Ireland slowed to a trickle. In addition, native born Irish-Argentines assimilated into the local community. The last time that hurling was played in Argentina was in 1980, when the Aer Lingus Hurling Club conducted a three-week tour of the country and played matches at several locations.

=== Australia ===
The earliest reference to hurling in Australia is related in the book "Sketches of Garryowen". On 12 July 1844, a match took place at Batman's Hill in Melbourne as a counterpoint to a march by the Orange Order. Reportedly, the hurling match attracted a crowd of five hundred Irish immigrants, while the Orange march shivered out of existence.

Several hurling clubs existed in Victoria in the 1870s including Melbourne, Collingwood, Upper Yarra, Richmond and Geelong.

In 1885, a game between two Sydney-based teams took place before a crowd of over ten thousand spectators. Reportedly, the contest was greatly enjoyed despite the fact that one newspaper dubbed the game "Two Degrees Safer Than War".

Arden Street Oval in North Melbourne was used by Irish immigrants during the 1920s. The game in Australasia is administered by Australasia GAA.

=== Great Britain ===
Hurling was brought to Great Britain in the 19th century. The game is administered by British GAA. Lancashire and Warwickshire compete at inter-county level in the Lory Meagher Cup, competing against other counties in Ireland. London is the only non-Irish team to have won the All-Ireland Senior Hurling Championship (having captured the title in 1901), and after winning the 2012 Christy Ring Cup gained the right to contest the Liam MacCarthy Cup in 2013. Robert Emmets of London won the All-Ireland Intermediate Club Hurling Championship in 2007, making them the first club in Britain and outside of Ireland to achieve this title.

The first ever hurling game played in the Scottish Highlands was played at Easter 2012 between CLG Micheal Breathnach and Fir Uladh, an Ulster select of Gaeiligoiri, as part of the Iomain Cholmcille festival, na Breathnaich coming out victorious.

Scotland and Wales also have their own clubs, Ceann Creige in Glasgow and St. Colmcilles in Cardiff.

=== South Africa ===
Soldiers who served in the Irish Brigade during the Anglo-Boer War are believed to have played the game on the veldt. Immigrants from County Wicklow who had arrived to work in the explosives factory in Umbogintwini, KwaZulu-Natal formed a team c. 1915–16. A major burst of immigration in the 1920s led to the foundation of the Transvaal Hurling Association in Johannesburg in 1928. Games were traditionally played in a pitch on the site of the modern-day Johannesburg Central Railway Station every Easter Sunday after Mass.

In 1932, a South African hurling team sailed to Ireland to compete in the Tailteann Games, where they carried a banner donated by a convent of Irish nuns in Cape Town. On their arrival, they were personally received by the Taoiseach (Prime Minister) at the time, Éamon de Valera.

South African hurling continued to prosper until the outbreak of the Second World War, which caused immigration from Ireland to cease and made it impossible to import equipment. Games of hurling and Gaelic football were occasionally sponsored by the Christian Brothers schools in Boksburg and Pretoria well into the 1950s. Both games have all but ceased to be played.

=== North America ===
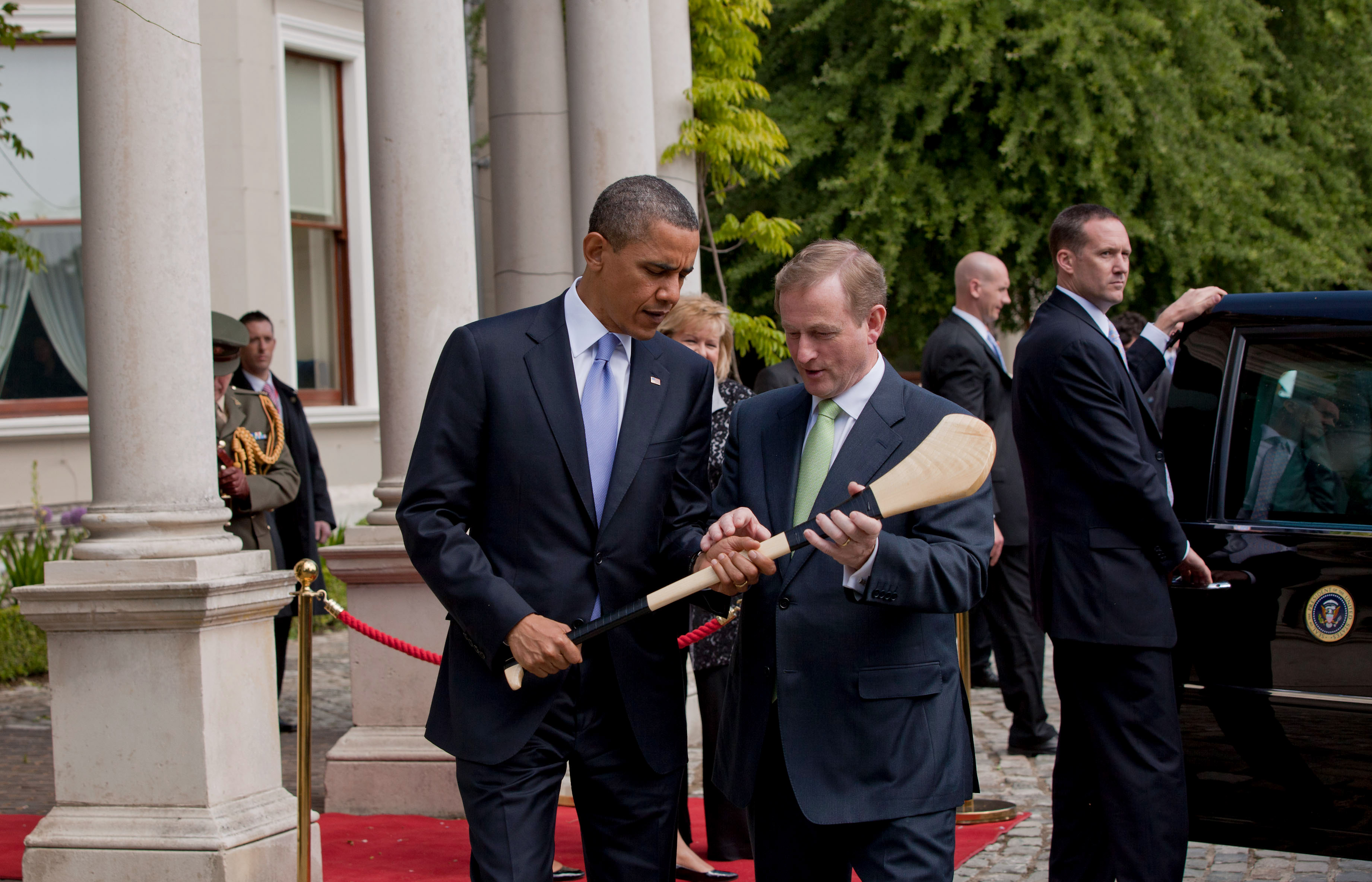
U.S. president Barack Obama accepting a hurley from Taoiseach Enda Kenny

References to hurling on the North American continent date from the 1780s in modern-day Canada concerning immigrants from County Waterford and County Kilkenny, and also, in New York City. After the end of the American Revolution, references to hurling cease in American newspapers until the aftermath of the Great Famine when Irish people moved to America in huge numbers, bringing the game with them. Newspaper reports from the 1850s refer to occasional matches played in San Francisco, Hoboken and New York City. The first game of hurling played under GAA rules outside Ireland was played on Boston Common in June 1886.

In 1888, there was an American tour by fifty Gaelic athletes from Ireland, known as the 'American Invasion'. This created enough interest among Irish Americans to lay the groundwork for the North American GAA. By the end of 1889, almost a dozen GAA clubs existed in America, many of them in and around New York City, Philadelphia and Chicago. Later, clubs were formed in Boston, Cleveland, and many other centers of Irish America. Concord, New Hampshire has its state's only hurling team, New Hampshire Wolves, sponsored by Litherman's Limited Craft Brewery.

In 1910, twenty-two hurlers, composed of an equal number from Chicago and New York, conducted a tour of Ireland, where they played against the County teams from Kilkenny, Tipperary, Limerick, Dublin and Wexford. Traditionally, hurling was a game played by Irish immigrants and discarded by their children. Many American hurling teams took to raising money to import players directly from Ireland. In recent years, this has changed considerably with the advent of the Internet and increased travel. The Barley House Wolves hurling team from New Hampshire was formed when U.S. soldiers returning from Iraq saw a hurling game on the television in Shannon Airport as their plane refuelled. Outside of the traditional North American GAA cities of New York, Boston, Chicago and San Francisco, clubs are springing up in other places where they consist of predominantly American-born players who bring a new dimension to the game and actively seek to promote it as a mainstream sport, especially Joe Maher, a leading expert at the sport in Boston.

The Milwaukee Hurling Club, with 300 members, is the largest Hurling club in the world outside Ireland, and is made of mostly Americans and very few Irish immigrants. The St. Louis Gaelic Athletic Club was established in 2002 and has expanded its organization to an eight team hurling league in the spring and six team Gaelic football league in the fall. They also have a 30-member camogie league. Saint Louis has won two National Championships in Jr C Hurling (2004 and 2011), as well as two National Championships in Jr D Gaelic Football (2005, and 2013). The Indianapolis Hurling Club began in 2002, then reformed in 2005. In 2008, the Indy Hurling Club won the Junior C National Championship. In 2011, Indy had 7 club teams and sent a Junior B, Junior C and Camogie team to nationals.

The GAA have also begun to invest in American college students with university teams springing up at University of Connecticut, Stanford University, UC Berkeley, Purdue University, Indiana University, University of Montana and other schools. On 31 January 2009, the first ever US collegiate hurling match was held between UC Berkeley and Stanford University, organized by the newly formed California Collegiate Gaelic Athletic Association. UC Berkeley won the challenge match by one point, while Stanford won the next two CCGAA matches to win the first collegiate cup competition in the U.S. On Memorial Day Weekend of 2011, the first ever National Collegiate GAA championship was played. The Indiana University Hurling Club won all matches of the tournament, and won by four points in the championship final to be crowned the first ever U.S. National Collegiate Champions.

=== Olympic Games ===
Hurling was a demonstration sport at the 1904 Summer Olympics in St. Louis, Missouri, in the United States. A single match was played between two American clubs, Innisfails from St. Louis and Fenians from Chicago. Innisfails won 2-2 to 0-2.

== Major hurling competitions ==
Kilkenny is the only "Hurling-only" county; the 14 light coloured counties are Football-only; the remaining 17 compete in both (see image description for details).

- All-Ireland Senior Hurling Championship
  - Leinster Senior Hurling Championship
  - Munster Senior Hurling Championship
- National Hurling League
- Joe McDonagh Cup
- Christy Ring Cup
- Nicky Rackard Cup
- Lory Meagher Cup
- All-Ireland Senior Club Hurling Championship
  - Leinster Senior Club Hurling Championship
  - Munster Senior Club Hurling Championship
- All-Ireland Under-20 Hurling Championship
  - Leinster Under-20 Hurling Championship
  - Munster U-20 Hurling Championship
- All-Ireland Minor Hurling Championship
- Poc Fada
- Féile na nGael
- Shinty-Hurling International Series

== See also ==
- Camogie
- Field hockey
- Shinty
- Women's shinty
- Bando
- Cammag
