= National U.S. Collegiate Hurling Champions =

List of collegiate hurling team winners

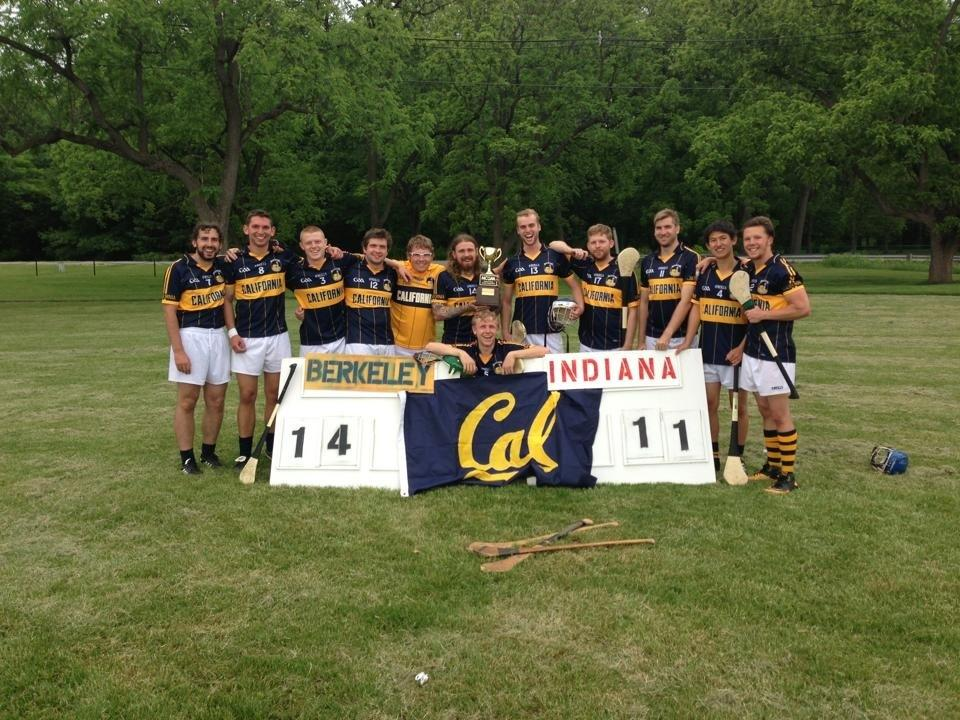
U.S. NCGAA Hurling Champions 2013 - University of California, Berkeley

The National Collegiate Gaelic Athletic Association is a non-profit organization that oversees hurling and Gaelic football sports for universities in North America. Since beginning in 2011, the NCGAA has grown to over 27 active clubs across the United States and Canada.

The first ever U.S. NCGAA hurling championship took place in 2011. In 2014, a second lower division of the championship, known as the Shield, was introduced. The NCGAA expanded to include Gaelic football in 2022.

The NCGAA championship has been held at various times throughout the year and has settled into the weekend of Saint Patrick's day.

== Team Successes ==
=== Hurling ===
In 2011, Indiana University won the first hurling championship, beating UC Berkeley 3-4 (13) to 1-6 (9). The University of Montana became the first team to win the championship back-to-back, doing so in both 2014 and 2015 and in 2017 and 2018. The University of Pittsburgh became the first team to win the NCGAA championship four times in a row from 2019 to 2023 (the 2021 championships was cancelled due to the COVID-19 pandemic). Two players from the University of Pittsburgh, Luca Donini and Stephen Wagner, played in all four championships. Purdue University won back-to-back championships in 2024 and 2025, with both wins broadcast live by ESPN (see "Growing the Game").

A complete list of winners of the U.S. NCGAA hurling championship is below.

Year	Winner	Location
2011	Indiana University	Chicago, Illinois
2012	Purdue University	Palo Alto, California
2013	University of California, Berkeley	West Lafayette, Indiana
2014	University of Montana, Missoula	New York, New York
2015	University of Montana, Missoula	Missoula, Montana
2016	University of Connecticut	Boulder, Colorado
2017	University of Montana, Missoula	Chicago, Illinois
2018	University of Montana, Missoula	Boulder, Colorado
2019	University of Pittsburgh	Chapel Hill, North Carolina
2020	University of Pittsburgh	Orlando, Florida
2022	University of Pittsburgh	Orlando, Florida
2023	University of Pittsburgh	Louisville, Kentucky
2024	Purdue University	Salt Lake City, Utah
2025	Purdue University	Denver, Colorado
2026	Purdue University	Orlando, Florida
2027	tbd	Indianapolis, Indiana
2028	tbd	Phoenix, Arizona

== Growing the Game ==
Besides overseeing the competitive aspect of collegiate hurling, the NCGAA tries to raise awareness and increase participation of hurling in America.

=== 2024 National Championship ===
In 2024, the NCGAA final was televised on ESPN3. This was the first nationally televised match in the United States since the All-Ireland Final in 1973. Purdue University defeated Colorado University at Zion Bank Stadium in Salt Lake City, Utah, to win the hurling final. The final score reported on ESPN's live stream was 5-12 (27) to 1-11 (14). The correct score on review was 6-12 (30) to 1-11 (14)

=== Details ===
17 March 2024
13:30 MST

Purdue University	6–12 – 1–11	University of Colorado Boulder
Evan Grealish 1–10 (0–6f, 0-3 65'); Danny Rubin 3–0; Michael Brennan 1–1; Travis Gregory 1–0; Liam Clarke 0–1		Conall McCabe 0–9 (0–1f, 0-1 65'); Paco 1–0; Patrick Burns 0–1; Michael Jordan 0–1 (0–1f)

Zions Bank Stadium, Salt Lake City

GK	0	Clay Williams
FB	59	Ian Cockrell (c)
FB	30	Michael Wise
WB	25	Ryan McLaughlin
HB	69	Sean Harkin
WB	97	Blake Kessler
MF	83	Dylan Clarke
MF	15	Michael Brennan
WF	24	Liam Clarke
HF	11	Evan Grealish
WF	17	Daylen Conn
FF	5	Grayson Fish
FF	6	Danny Rubin (c)
Substitutes:
F	12	Joseph Corbett
F	67	Reese Kerschner
B	3	Jonah Peterson
F	44	Ben Cabot
B	37	Mikey Davis
F	43	Travis Gregory
F	27	Jeremiah Budd
B	45	Reilly Bresnahan
B	57	Izzy Surinak
F	4	Katie Essex
F	1	Van Hibbeln
F	16	Adam Bartley
B	20	Liam Rogers

GK	1	Seamus O'Shea
FB	2	Amy Holland
FB	33	Larry Enderson
WB	3	Leo Buck
HB	33	Mark Sheehan
WB	9	Kieran Maguire
MF	28	Conall McCabe
MF	23	Michael Jordan
WF	69	Patrick Burns
HF	34	Maximiliano Silva
WF	7	Will Poey
FF	18	Logan Wallace
FF	6	Ava Russell

=== College GameDay ===
The first game of the 2024 U.S. college football season was played in Ireland. It marked the first time that the pre-game television sports show "College GameDay" originated outside of the United States. As part of the show, the NCGAA's Naoise Waldron taught Desmond Howard, Jess Simms and Stanford Steve the basics of hurling.

=== Heinz History Center ===
To honor the University of Pittsburgh's four-in-a-row NCGAA championships, the Heinz History Center included an exhibit on the university's hurling team in the entryway for the Western Pennsylvania Sports Museum.
