= Bando (sport) =

Team sport played with wood sticks and ball

Bando is a team sport – related to field hockey, hurling, shinty, and bandy – which was first recorded in Wales in the eighteenth century.

A bando game is played on a large level field between teams of up to thirty players each of them equipped with a bando: a curve-ended stick resembling that used in field hockey. Although no formal rules are known, the objective of the game was to strike a ball between two marks which served as goals at either end of the pitch. Popular in Glamorgan in the nineteenth century, the sport all but vanished by the end of the century.

== History ==
Bando is believed to have common origins with games like bandy. The game was first recorded in the late eighteenth century, and in 1797 a traveller en route from Cowbridge to Pyle noted "the extraordinary barrenness" of the locality in ash and elm trees, hard woods ideal for bando bats, and came across hordes of people hastening to the sea shore to watch a game of bando. Whereas the sticks were made of hard wood, the ball, known as a "colby", was normally of yew, box or crabapple. The sport was often played between local villages, with fierce rivalries in the west of Glamorgan between Baglan, Aberavon and Margam and in mid Glamorgan between Pyle, Kenfig and Llangynwyd. Edward Matthews of Ewenni records that no-one above the age of twelve-month would be seen without a bando stick.

Although many pre-industrial games are recorded to be lawless affairs with haphazard rules, the contrary appears true with bando. Once a challenge of a game was made between villages, wagers were normally set which demanded an agreed set of rules, including the number of players, normally between 20 and 30 and the size of the playing area. Matthews records a playing area of 200 yards, with the goal markers at each end set ten yards apart. Despite a set of rules, the game was still open to violent play with players often using their bando sticks to strike their opponents.

One of the more notable teams of the time were the "Margam Bando Boys", a team who played on Aberavon Beach. The team are celebrated in a macaronic ballad, "The Margam Bando Boys", written in the earlier part of the nineteenth century.

"Margam Bando Boys", (first three verses)

Due praises I'll bestow
And all the world shall know
That Margam valour shall keep its colour
When Kenfig's waters flow

Our master, straight and tall
Is foremost with the ball;
He is, we know it, and must allow it,
The fastest man of all

Let cricket players blame,
And seek to slight our fame,
Their bat and wicket can never lick it,
This ancient manly game

Bando is believed to be the first mass spectator sport of Glamorgan and Wales, and in 1817 a match between Margam and Newton Nottage attracted over 3,000 spectators. The sport remained popular throughout the century with notable personalities known to play the sport including preacher John Elias and future prime minister, David Lloyd George. The sport continued to be played until the second half of the nineteenth century, but was beginning to be replaced by other sports. The game survived in the Aberavon area until the death of Theodore Talbot, the captain of the Margam Bando Boys in 1876. Talbot, the son of Christopher Rice Mansel Talbot and heir to the Margam Estate was a supporter of the sport, and his death coincided with the coming of the Mansel, Avon Vale and Taibach tinworks. The employees turned to a new sport spreading through south Wales, rugby union, with Aberavon Rugby Football Club forming in 1876.

Despite having no religious links with Easter, the sport became a tradition on the date as part of some parish festivals, unlike traditional West-Walian games such as Smeit, which were generally banned on Sundays.

== Revival and Campau Celtaidd Cymru ==
In 2025, Campau Celtaidd Cymru (CCC) was founded with the aim of reviving the ancient sports of Wales, including Bando.

The cultural and sporting organisation hosted a Bando tournament at Margam Cricket Club on 28 May 2025 to coincide with Eisteddfod yr Urdd Dur a Môr, which was held between 26 and 31 May 2025 at Margam Park.

Pupils from three local primary schools competed in the tournament, which marked the official launch of CCC. The tournament represented the first organised games of Bando in over a century.

CCC hope to recreate some bandis (the playing sticks) based on an original in the near future with a view to a historical re-enactment of the ancient version of the game, probably on Cynffig beach.

== Bibliography ==
- Morgan, Prys, ed. (1988). Glamorgan County History, Volume VI, Glamorgan Society 1780 to 1980. Cardiff: University of Wales Press. ISBN 0-904730-05-0.
