= Sliotar =

Ball used in hurling

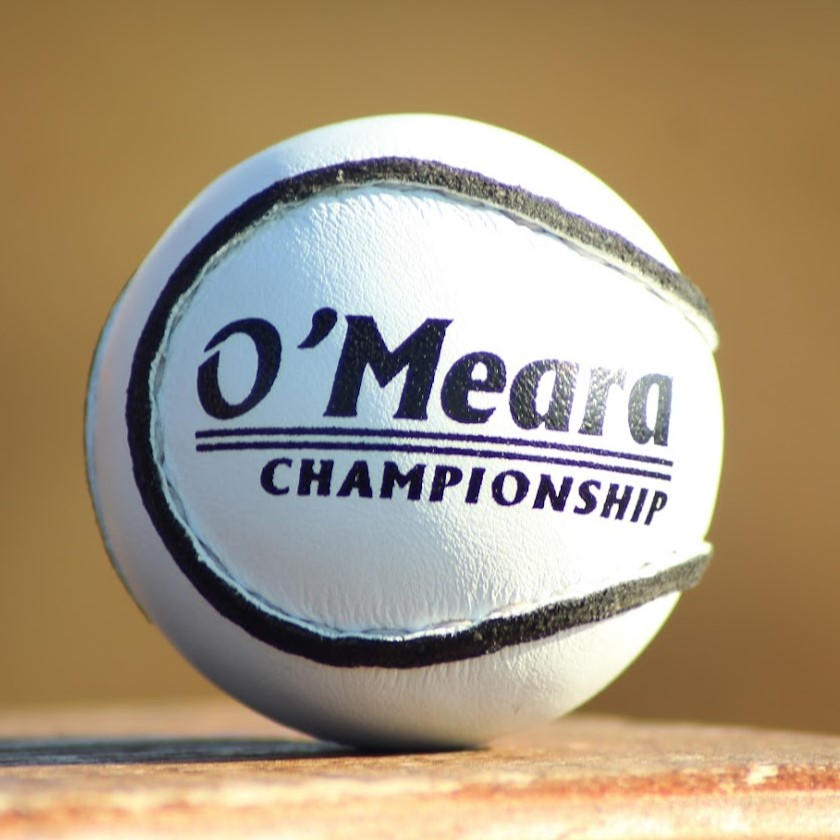
A hurling sliotar

A sliotar (/ˈslɪtər, ˈʃlɪtər/ S(H)LIT-ər, Irish: [ˈʃl̠ʲɪt̪ˠəɾˠ]) or sliothar is a hard solid sphere slightly larger than a tennis ball, consisting of a cork core covered by two pieces of leather stitched together. Sometimes called a "hurling ball", it resembles a baseball with more pronounced stitching. It is used in the Gaelic games of hurling, camogie and rounders.

== Dimensions ==
An official Gaelic Athletic Association (GAA) sliotar, as used in top-level hurling competitions such as the National Hurling League or the All-Ireland Senior Hurling Championships, is subject to strict regulations as regards its size, mass and composition.

The following regulations apply:

- The diameter is between 69 and 72 mm (2.7 and 2.8 in) not including the rib
- The mass is between 110 and 120 g (3.9 and 4.2 oz)
- The rib height is between 2 mm and 2.8 mm, and width between 3.6 mm and 5.4 mm
- The leather cover can be between 1.8 mm and 2.7 mm and is laminated with a coating of no more than 0.15 mm

Approved sliotars carry a GAA mark of approval. The GAA maintains a list of approved suppliers, based on manufacturers who pass their inspection.

== History ==
Early (pre-GAA) sliotars used various materials, depending on the part of the country, including combinations of wood, leather, rope and animal hair and even hollow bronze.

The etymology is uncertain, with some connecting it to sliabh ("mountain") and thar ("across"), after Cúchulainn's story of hitting a silver ball across a mountain. An archaic Irish name for a hurling-ball, used on the Aran Islands as well as elsewhere, was cnag; the term also means "knob, peg, skein of thread," indicating the ball's shape and nature. The term appears with the English spelling slitter in the 1890s–1920s. The spelling sliotar is not recorded until Dinneen's 1927 dictionary, where it is said to mean "a good quantity, as of food at a meal, a hurley-ball;" prior to that time, the name "hurley ball" or "hurling ball" was generally used. Among the first uses of sliotar in the Independent Newspapers archive is from an article in 1939.

In the early years of the GAA, there was no specific standard for the size or weight of sliotars. The man credited with initial standardisation of the sliotar is Ned Treston (1862–1949) of Gort, County Galway. He was selected to play in a match between South Galway and North Tipperary in February 1886 in Dublin. Prior the game, there was debate between the teams as regards the size of the sliotar. Treston made a sliotar at a nearby saddler, which was used in the game, and went on to be a prototype for subsequent sliotars.

Johnny McAuliffe (1896–1960) of County Limerick is credited with the modern design. Before his improvements the ball tended to be inconsistent due to poor manufacturing. It was also heavier than modern sliotars (over 200g), and due to being made partly with horse-hair, tended to lose shape during play, and become soggy in wet conditions. The brown colour also meant that the ball was difficult to see in some conditions. McAuliffe's changes introduced a cork core, with a 2-piece white-tanned leather covering as the standard materials. These changes led to a harder-wearing ball, which was water resistant and easier to see. The construction materials also meant that the ball was only about half as heavy as Treston's version.

In the early 2000s, the GAA experimented with using sliotars with rubber rather than cork cores; however, it was found that using a rubber core led to a more unpredictable bounce, and moved a lot faster than a ball with a cork core, especially in wet conditions. It was decided to return to a cork ball because of this. While different sized sliotars are used for different ages and codes (with, for example, senior camogie games using a "size 4" sliotar, and senior hurling a "size 5" ball), some claims have historically been made of non-standard balls being used to gain a perceived advantage in competition.

A yellow sliotar (roughly the same colour as a tennis ball) was introduced for the 2020 All-Ireland Senior Hurling Championship (initially the Liam MacCarthy Cup only) and has been the standard for all games at Minor age group and higher since 2024; not unlike tennis, the GAA made the change to make the ball easier to follow for both players, spectators, and television broadcasts. This change caused minor controversy as some players believed the yellow sliotar was inferior to the standard white sliotar. Another new development is the "smart sliotar", first trialled in the 2022 U20 All-Ireland Championships and mandated at all inter-county levels beginning in 2023. These balls contain a small near-field communication chip which can be scanned by the GAA's Foireann smartphone app to ensure that they meet GAA ball standards for production and dimensions.
