= Aeglagh Vannin =

- English: The Youth of Mann
- Formation: 1931
- Type: Cultural movement, youth movement
- Purpose: Promotion of traditional Manx music and dance.
- Region served: Isle of Man
- Key people: Mona Douglas

Aeglagh Vannin ("the Youth of Mann" in Manx Gaelic) was a youth group in the Isle of Man whose purpose was the engagement with and revitalisation of Manx language, history and culture. It was established by Mona Douglas in 1931, went through a number of mutations, and faded out in the 1970s. It is best remembered for its central role in the revival of Manx folk dancing.

== Background ==
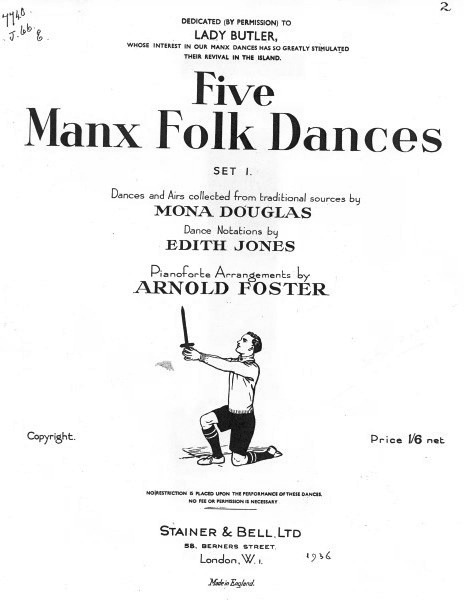
The publication of Manx folk dances first performed by the group that would become Aeglagh Vannin

In 1929 the English Folk Dance Society held its Easter Vacation School at Douglas in the Isle of Man. The Society asked Mona Douglas, a leading authority on Manx culture, to deliver a talk on local folk song during their stay. It had been assumed that no Manx folk dances had survived into the modern day, but Douglas was able to utilise some of the notes that she had taken earlier in her life in order to reconstruct three Manx dances into a form fit to be performed: ‘The Manx Dirk Dance’, ‘Hyndaa yn Bwoailley’ and ‘Eunyssagh Vona’. She then enlisted the help of Mr J.Q. Killey and Philip Leighton Stowell at Albert Road School in Ramsey in order to train a group of children to perform the dances for the Society.

The reconstructed dances proved to be a great success, resulting in an invitation for one of the boys, Billy Caine, to perform the subsequently controversial Manx Dirk Dance at the All-England Festival at the Royal Albert Hall the following summer. Douglas was later to report that, "The Ramsey schoolboy and his wonderful dance were the sensation of the Festival, and received special notices in all the big London papers." Children from the school were also invited to perform other Manx dances at the festival in the following years.

Although delighted with the success of the Manx dances amongst the English Folk Dance Society, Douglas saw the ultimate aim to lie not in the mere preservation of the dances but in a revival of their performance amongst the people of the Isle of Man:

"I am pleased that the English Folk Dance Society finds them interesting, and grateful for the help and encouragement given me by certain of its members, but the main point of my work will have been missed unless the Manx themselves claim and use their heritage of national dance, which is truly a part of national culture as its music or history."

Inspired by the work of Maud Gonne in Ireland and Urdd Gobaith Cymru in Wales, as well as Ny Maninee Aegey ('The Young Manx') which was founded at around the turn of the century by Douglas' friend and mentor, Sophia Morrison, Douglas concentrated her attention on the young for the revitalisation of Manx culture through the establishment of Aeglagh Vannin.

== Foundation and activities ==
Aeglagh Vannin was founded in Douglas on 1 August 1931. The central importance of youth and also the nationalist agenda at the heart of the organisation was evident in their motto: Piatchyn jiu, ashoon mairagh (Children today, a nation tomorrow).

Although the organisation was concerned with creating a sense of national identity and cultural pride, it was not overtly political. Mona Douglas explained in the one edition of the organisation's journal, Yn Lior Aeglagh Vannin: "The movement is cultural, not political, because we believe that nationalism is higher than politics."

Aeglagh Vannin's founding principles were:

1. To preserve, study and teach the Manx language.
2. To foster in the young people and children of the Island a love and knowledge of the history, folk-lore and traditions of their country and a realisation of their kinship with other Celtic Nations.
3. To encourage the creation of a modern Manx music, art, literature and drama.
4. To preserve the natural beauty of the Manx countryside and to protect rights of way etc.

Douglas explained these principles in 1932:

"[...] at present politics are not for us of the Aeglagh. We want to learn, and to help others to learn, the neglected language and traditions of our country. We want to preserve the beauty of the land. We want to create a new national art and music and literature and drama, built on tradition and racial foundations. And above all, we want so to inspire with these ideals the children who are growing up around us that they may be ready presently to carry on the work further than we ourselves can hope to do."

The organisation met after school weekly, "for the study of Celtic literature and Manx traditional dance." Also covered in their meetings were Manx history, language, folklore and song. A curious addition to the activities of the organisation was fencing, explained by a later cultural historian as being "to keep the boys' interest, as well as to prepare young people 'to defend the Manx nation'!"

By 1932 there were 93 members of Aeglagh Vannin, located both on and off the Isle of Man. However, Douglas was keen to gain more, writing in Yn Lior Aeglagh Vannin for more volunteers in the mold of those they had already:

“Which of us, walking the streets of Douglas or travelling over the mountains or watching the tossing sea, has not felt at some time that behind this dear visible land of ours, shining through it, there is strange, intangible, living power, part of our very selves, to which we owe service and allegiance. Some of us have already answered that demand, and Aeglagh Vannin is one result of that answer.”

In 1934 Mona Douglas composed an anthem for Aeglagh Vannin which demonstrates her belief in a form of Celtic Mysticism:

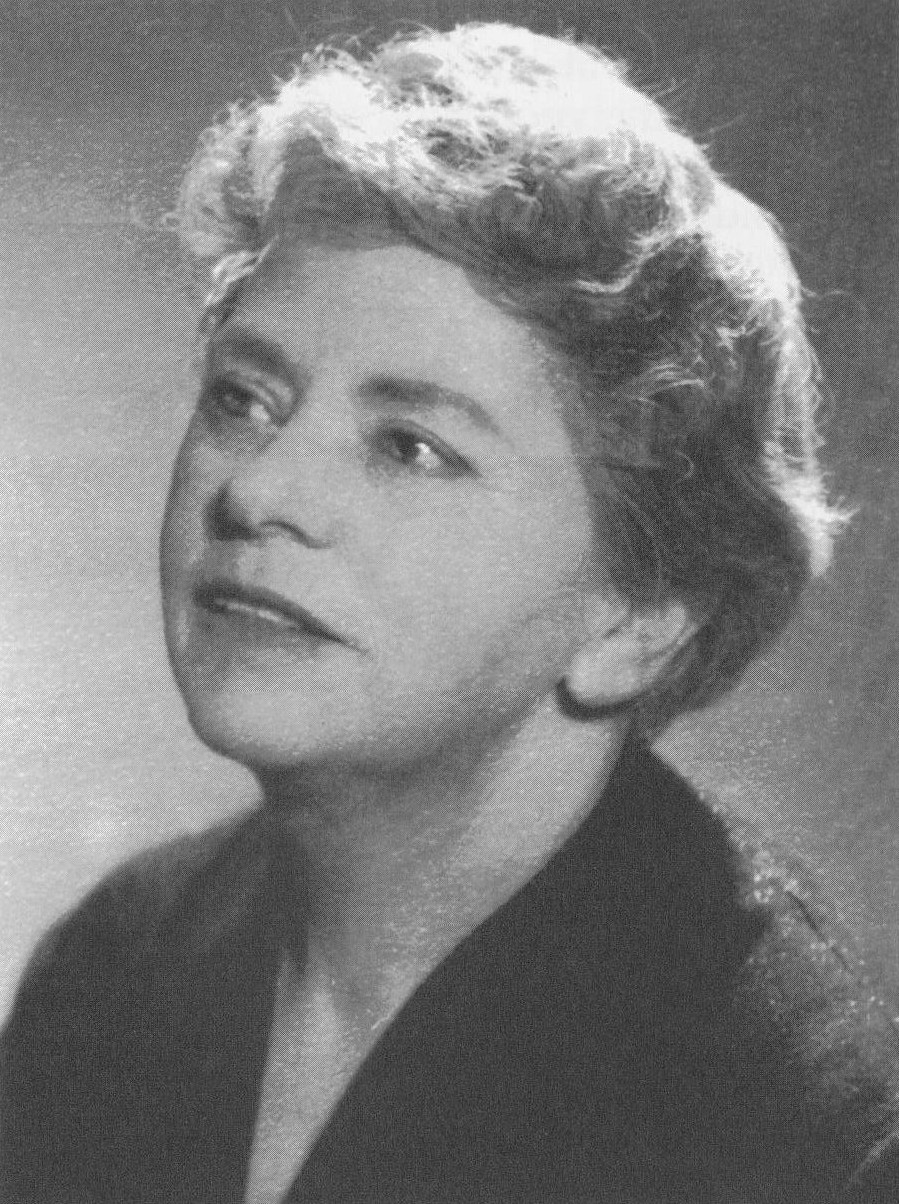
Mona Douglas

O Land of our allegiance
O Mannin of the sea!
May we be ever worthy
To claim our share in thee!
We hold thy soil as sacred
And though we journey far,
They flame of song and story
Burns where thy children are.

For us thine ancient glories
Gleam yet on sea and shore
In us the nation's spirit
Renews for evermore
And still our dreams make holy
The hills our fathers trod -
For in our Sacred Island
We touch the veil of God.

Aelagh Vannin visited England and Ireland numerous times in order to perform their Manx dances for other folk dance groups. They also made several trips to Dublin in order to be recorded for Irish television and radio. The children organised fundraising activities such as chopping firewood or making and selling toffee in order to cover their expenses.

== Later changes and demise ==
By the 1950s the membership of the only functioning part of Aeglagh Vannin had matured to be entirely made up of adults. In an attempt to revitalise activities amongst the original target youth audience, a new section was created in 1957 under the name, Aeglagh Beg ('little youth'). By 1959 this section had grown in strength sufficiently for the adult section to step aside to change their name to Caarjyn Vannin ('friends of Man') and enable the youth section to reclaim the original name of Aeglagh Vannin.

Mona Douglas's involvement in the organisation ceased in 1976 when she was 78. The organisation petered out some time after this.

Aeglagh Vannin is best remembered today for its central place in the revitalisation of Manx dance, as well as for its important role in the early stage of the modern period of the Manx cultural revival. This confirms the belief of its founder, Mona Douglas, who in 1949 called it "the cradle of our Manx folk dance revival."
