= Cusack Park =

Cusack Park may refer to the following sports stadiums in Ireland:

- Cusack Park (Ennis), home of Clare GAA
- TEG Cusack Park, Mullingar, home of Westmeath GAA
