= Culture of the Isle of Man =

The culture of the Isle of Man is influenced by its Celtic and, to a lesser extent, its Norse origins, though its close proximity to the United Kingdom, popularity as a UK tourist destination, and recent mass immigration by British migrant workers has meant that British influence has been dominant since the Revestment period. Recent revival campaigns have attempted to preserve the surviving vestiges of Manx culture after a long period of Anglicisation, and significant interest in the Manx language, history and musical tradition has been the result.

== Language ==
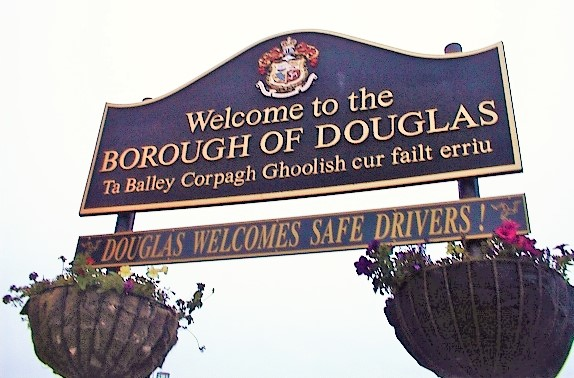
A bilingual sign in the Isle of Man featuring Manx Gaelic and English

The official language of the Isle of Man is English. Manx Gaelic has traditionally been spoken but is now considered "critically endangered".

The Manx Gaelic language is a Goidelic Celtic language and is one of a number of insular Celtic languages spoken in the British Isles. Manx Gaelic has been officially recognised as a legitimate autochthonous regional language under the European Charter for Regional or Minority Languages, ratified by the United Kingdom on 27 March 2001 on behalf of the Isle of Man government.

The Manx language is closely related to the Irish language and to Scottish Gaelic. By the middle of the 20th century, only a few elderly native speakers remained: the last of them, Ned Maddrell, died on 27 December 1974. By then a scholarly revival had begun to spread to the populace, and many had learned Manx as a second language. The first native speakers of Manx (bilingual with English) in many years have now appeared: children brought up by Manx-speaking parents. Primary immersion education in Manx is provided by the Manx government: since 2003, the former St John's School building has been used by the Bunscoill Ghaelgagh (a Manx language-medium primary school). Degrees in Manx are available from the Isle of Man College and the Centre for Manx Studies. Manx-language playgroups also exist and Manx language classes are available in island schools. In the 2001 census, 1,689 out of 76,315, or 2.2% of the population, claimed to have knowledge of Manx, although the degree of knowledge in these cases presumably varied.

In common use are the greetings moghrey mie and fastyr mie which mean good morning and good afternoon respectively. The Manx language uses "afternoon" in place of "evening". Another frequently heard Manx expression is traa dy liooar meaning time enough, which is supposed to represent a stereotypical "mañana" view of the Manx attitude to life.

Manx English, or Anglo-Manx, is the historical local dialect of English, but its use has decreased. It has many borrowings from the Manx language. Early strata of Anglo-Manx contain much of Gaelic and Norse origin, but more recent Anglo-Manx displays heavy influence from Liverpool and Lancashire in North West England. The best known recorder of the Anglo-Manx dialect was the poet, T.E. Brown.

In recent years, the Anglo-Manx dialect has almost disappeared in the face of increasing immigration and cultural influence from the United Kingdom. A few words remain in general use, but apart from the Manx accent, little remains of this dialect and it is seldom heard on the island in its original form today.

== Literature ==
The earliest datable text in Manx, a poetic history of the Isle of Man from the introduction of Christianity, dates to the 16th century at the latest.

Christianity has been an overwhelming influence on Manx literature. Religious literature was common, but surviving secular writing much rarer. The Book of Common Prayer and Bible were translated into Manx in the 17th and 18th centuries. The first Manx Bible was printed between 1771 and 1775 and is the source and standard for modern Manx orthography. The first printed work in Manx, Coyrle Sodjeh, dates from 1707: a translation of a Prayer Book catechism in English by Bishop Thomas Wilson.

With the revival of Manx, new literature has appeared, including Contoyryssyn Ealish ayns Cheer ny Yindyssyn, a Manx translation of Alice in Wonderland by Brian Stowell, published in 1990.

== Arts ==
Established in 1965, the Isle of Man Arts Council exists to promote the Island's cultural identity and encourage enjoyment and participation in the arts. A sponsored body of the Department of Education, Sport and Culture, it offers grants, sponsorship and underwriting to a wide variety of individuals, schools, groups and venues across the community.

The Villa Marina is an entertainment venue in Douglas, Isle of Man, which forms part of the wider Villa-Gaiety complex. It is located on Harris Promenade, looking out onto Douglas Bay, and comprises the Royal Hall, Broadway Cinema, Promenade Suite, Dragon's Castle and the Colonnade Gardens.

The Gaiety Theatre and Opera House is a theatre in Douglas, Isle of Man which together with the Villa Marina forms the Villa-Gaiety complex. The Gaiety is situated on Douglas promenade, overlooking the sea and adjacent to the Villa Gardens, Arcade and Butts.

== Symbols ==
Manx triskelion

For centuries, the island's symbol has been its ancient triskelion, a device similar to Sicily's trinacria: three bent legs, each with a spur, joined at the thigh. The Manx triskelion does not appear to have an official design: government publications, currency, flags, the tourist authority and others all use different variants. Most, but not all, preserve rotational symmetry, some running clockwise, others anti-clockwise. Some have the uppermost thigh at 12:00 on the clock face, others at 11:30 or 10:00, etc. Some have the knee bent at 90°, some at 60°, some at closer to 120°. Also, the degree of ornamentation of the leg wear and spur varies considerably.

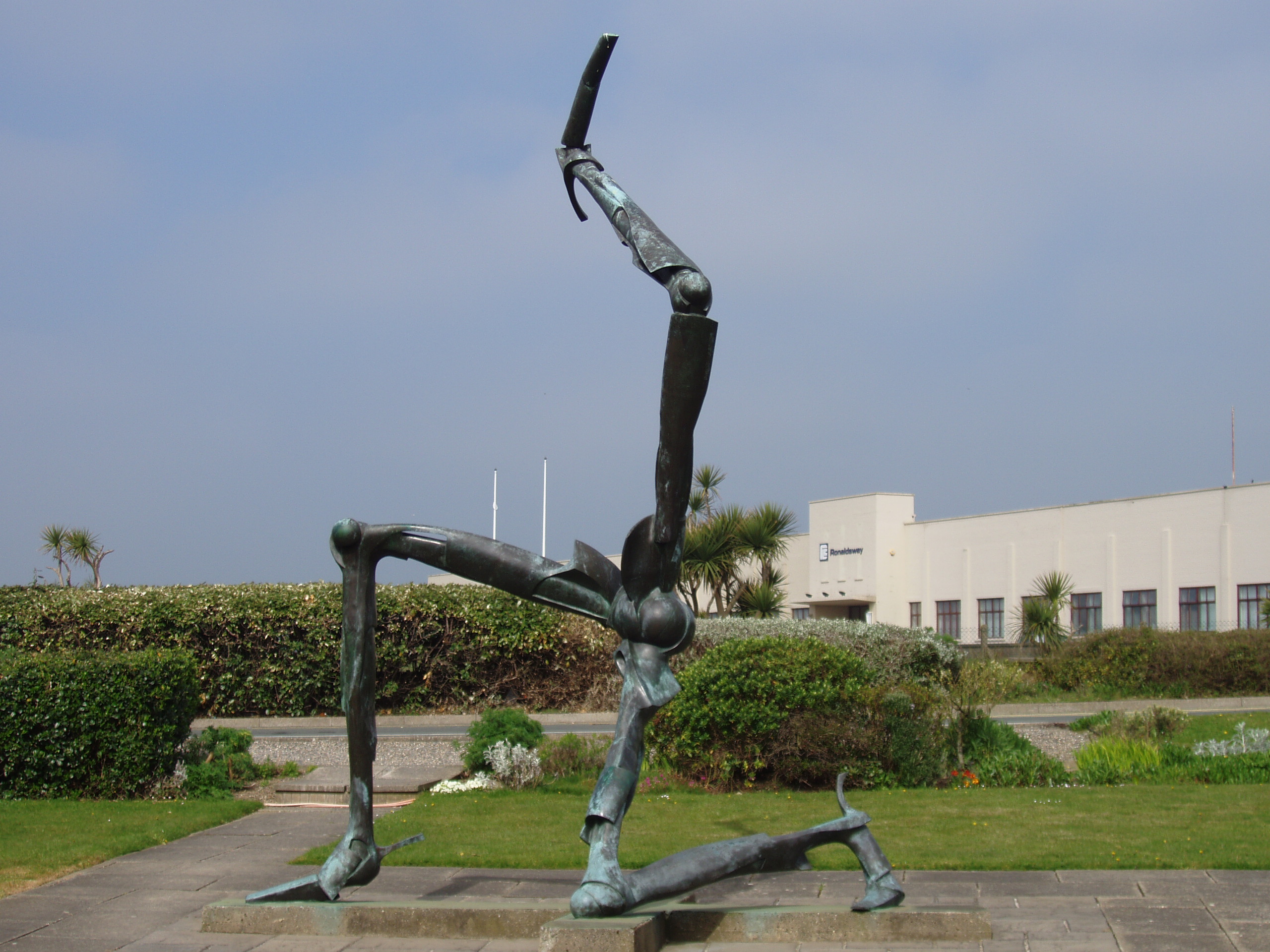
Sculpture by Bryan Kneale called The Legs of Man outside Ronaldsway Airport

The three legs are reflected in the island's Latin motto (adopted late in the symbol's history): "Quocunque Jeceris Stabit"; traditionally translated into English as "Whithersoever you throw it, it will stand", or "Whichever way you throw it, it will stand".

The origin of the Three Legs of Man (as they are usually called) is explained in the Manx legend that Manannan repelled an invasion by transforming into the three legs and rolling down the hill and defeating the invaders.

== Religion ==
The predominant religious tradition of the island is Anglican Christianity. The ancient Christian Church of the island is today part of the Church of England. The present-day Anglican Diocese of Sodor and Man traces its history - through many changes in tradition and detail - to 1154. Like all ancient Anglican churches, the diocese formed part of the then mainstream of western Christian tradition, the Roman Catholic Church until the 16th-century English Reformation. The diocese has been part of the national churches of Norway, Scotland, and England. It has also come under the influence of Irish religious tradition. Since 1541 its bishop and 28 parishes have formed part of the ecclesiastical Province of York.

Other Christian churches also operate on Mann. The second-largest denomination is the Methodist Church, which is close in size to the Anglican diocese. There are eight Roman Catholic parish churches, under the authority of the Roman Catholic Archbishop of Liverpool. Additionally there are five Baptist churches, four Pentecostal churches, the Salvation Army, the Church of Jesus Christ of Latter-Day-Saints, a congregation of Jehovah's Witnesses, two United Reformed churches, and other Christian churches. There are also many other faith organisations on the island. The small Muslim community has a mosque in Douglas, which local worshippers regularly attend several times a day. There is a small Jewish community on the island.

== Music ==
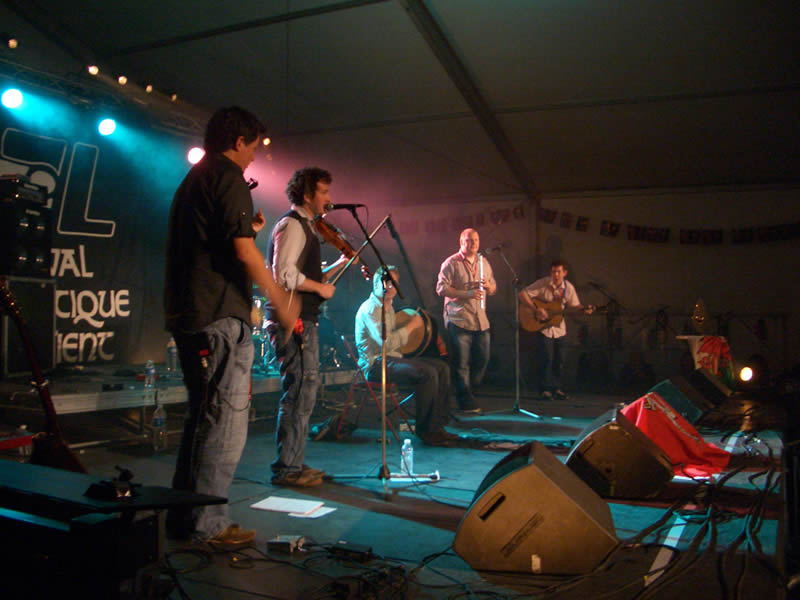
King Chiaullee on stage in Lorient, 2008

Prior to the 15th century, little can be determined about the character of music on the Isle of Man. There are many carved crosses from this era, but they depict a total of two musicians, one lur player and a harpist. Songs from this era may have had Scandinavian origins; some also bear similarities to Irish and Scottish music. The song Reeaghyn dy Vannin (the Manx sword dance), is very similar to a lullaby from the Hebrides and is also said to have been a ritual dance during the Scandinavian era.

Church music is the most documented Manx music of the 19th century. The first collection of Manx church songs was printed in 1799, and was followed by many other collections, though it was not until the 1870s and 1880s that Manx music began to be published in any great quantity, as drawing-room ballads, religious songs, and choral arrangements all became popular. The proliferation of this music coincided with a boom in the tourism industry for the Isle, and Manx music-hall and dance-hall songs and dances saw increased demand.

By the 20th century instrumental music accompanied most worship on the Isle of Man. Later in the 20th century, Manx church musical traditions slowly declined.

The 1970s folk revival was kickstarted, after the 1974 death of the last native speaker of Manx, by a music festival called Yn Çhruinnaght in Ramsey.

Culture Vannin has a dedicated Manx Music Development Officer who works to promote Manx music and dance in both the school curriculum and the wider community. CDs by bands, soloists and Gaelic choirs are frequently produced.

== Myth, legend and folklore ==
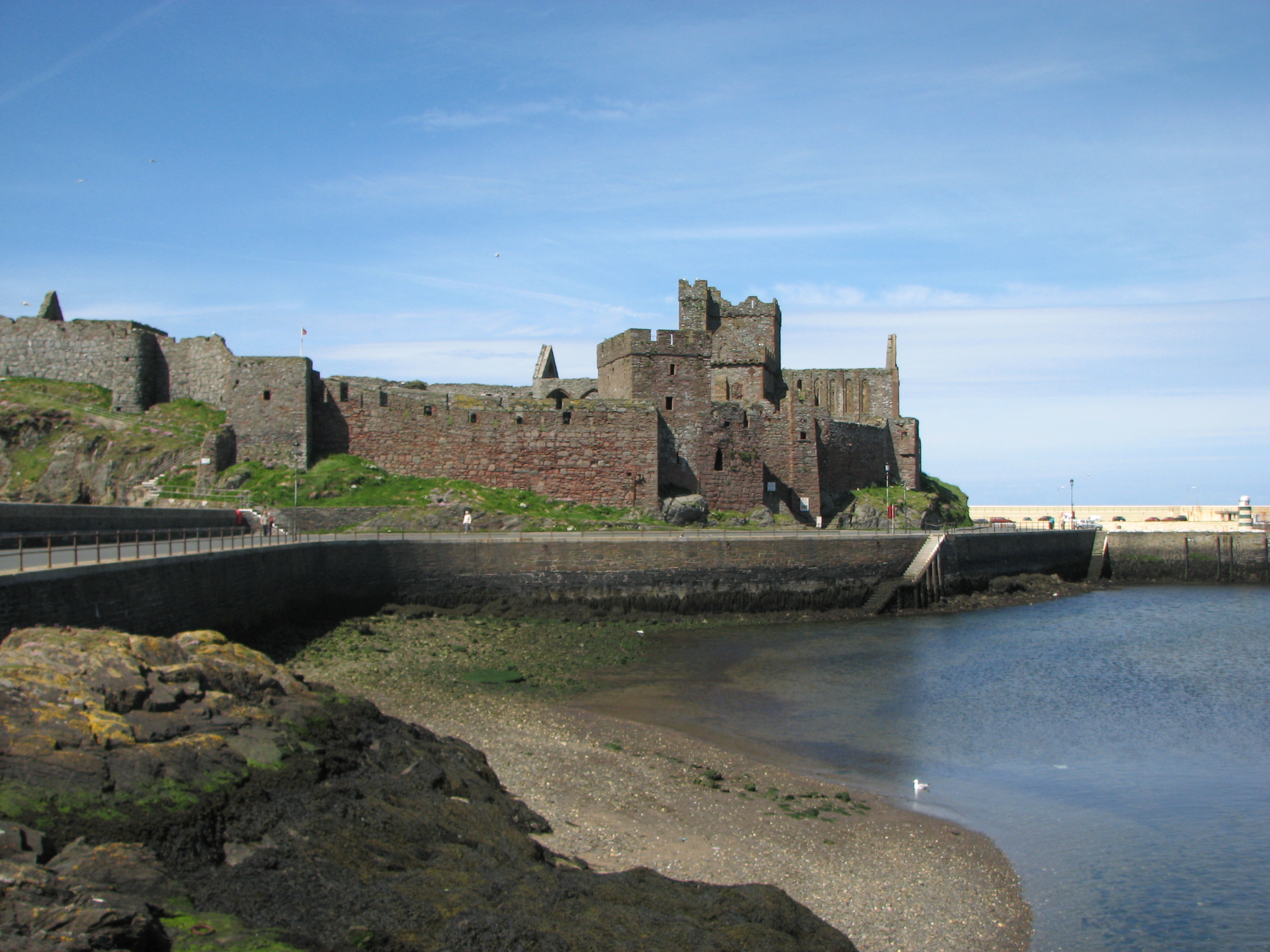
Peel Castle

=== Stories concerning the island's history ===
An Irish folktale attributes the formation of the Isle of Man to Ireland's legendary hero Fionn mac Cumhaill (commonly anglicised to Finn McCool). Finn was in pursuit of a Scottish giant, and hoping to prevent his escape by swimming across the sea, he scooped a huge mass of clay and rock from Northern Ireland and hurled it, but he overshot, and the chunk of earth landed in the Irish Sea, thus creating the Isle Of Man. The hole he created became Lough Neagh.

The name of Isle of Man is eponymous after Manannán mac Lir, a Celtic sea god, according to an old Irish lexicon (Cormac's glossary or Sanas Cormaic). A further tidbit of Manx mythology provides that Manannan, who was "the first man of Man, rolled on three legs like a wheel through the mist" (O'Donovan, the translator of the glossary. Manannan was called "The Three-Legged Man" (Manx: Yn Doinney Troor Cassgh) and all the inhabitants were three-legged when St. Patrick arrived.

A "traditionary ballad" entitled Mannanan beg mac y Leirr; ny, slane coontey jeh Ellan Vannin ("Little Mannanan son of Leirr; or, an (whole) account of the Isle of Man")(dated to 1507–22), states that the Isle of Man was once under the rule of Mannan, who used to impose a token tax from the island folk, until Saint Patrick came and banished the heathen. One quatrain runs: "It was not with his sword he kept it/ Neither with arrows or bow. / But when he would see ships sailing, / He would cover it round with a fog." (Str. 4) ". So Mannanan here is said to have raised a mist or fog to conceal the whole island from detection (cf. Féth fíada). The fee or rent that Mannanan demanded was a bundle of coarse marsh-grass like rushes (leaogher-ghlass), to be delivered every "Midsummer Eve" (24 June)

=== Mythical creatures ===
In the Manx tradition of folklore, there are many stories of mythical creatures and characters. These include:

- the Buggane, a malevolent spirit who according to legend blew the roof off St Trinian's Church in a fit of rage
- the often helpful but unpredictable Fenodyree, comparable to the brownie
- the Glashtyn, a water-dwelling shapeshifter (a hairy goblin in some tales and a water-horse in others) that comes onto land to interact with humans or livestock
- the tarroo-ushtey or Water-Bull, an "amphibious creature" resembling a bull that tries unsuccessfully to procreate with cows
- the cabbyl-ushtey or water horse, the more harmless variant of the Scottish each-uisge
- the Moddey Dhoo, a ghostly black dog who once wandered the walls and corridors of Peel Castle and frightened the guards on duty
- Jimmy Squarefoot, a peaceful bipedal creature with a human body, a pig's head, and boar tusks

Mann is also said to be home to the mooinjer veggey /muɲdʒer veɣə/) or the little folk in the Manx language, though they are sometimes referred to obliquely by locals as themselves. There is a famous Fairy Bridge and it is said to be bad luck if one fails to wish the fairies good morning or afternoon when passing over it. Other types of fairies are the Mi'raj (???) and the Arkan Sonney or Arc-Vuc-Soney "Lucky-Boar-Pig".

== Cuisine ==
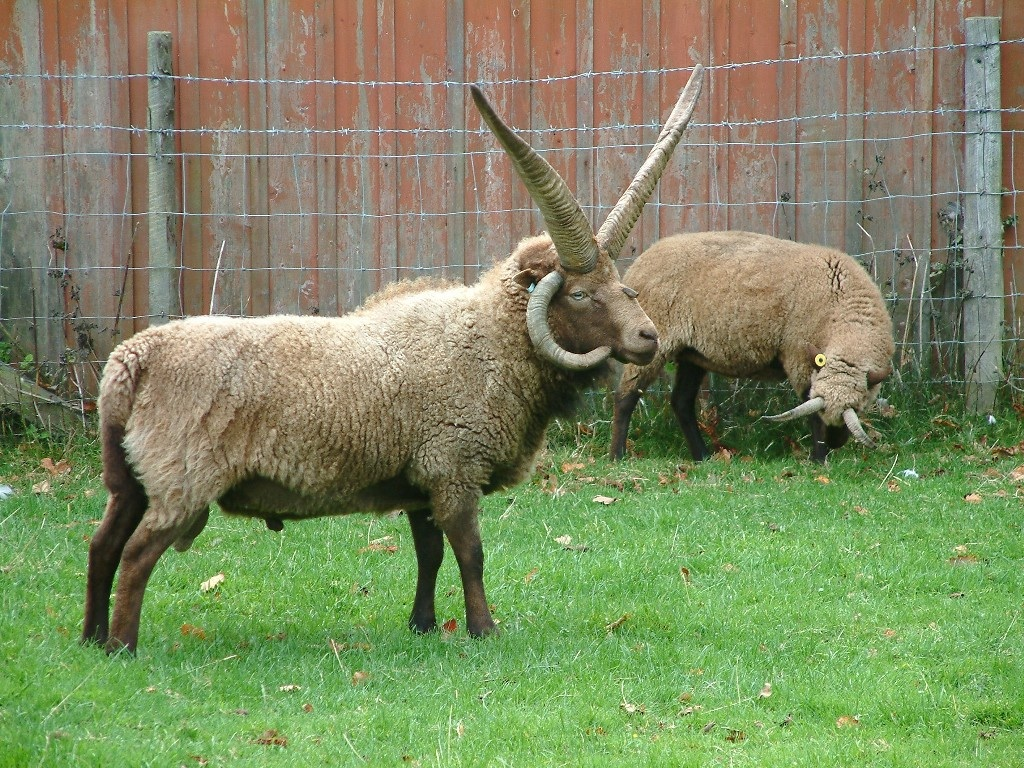
Manx Loaghtan sheep are bred for their meat on the island and have an important place in Manx cuisine.

Traditionally the national dish of the island is "spuds and herrin", boiled potatoes and herring. This plain dish is chosen because of its role supporting the subsistence farmers of the island, who crofted the land and fished the sea for centuries.

A more recent claim for the title of national dish is the ubiquitous chips, cheese and gravy. This dish, which is similar to poutine, is found in most of the island's fast-food outlets, and consists of thick-cut chips, covered in shredded Manx Cheddar cheese and topped with a thick gravy. Baked potato with a variety of toppings such as chili beans is a popular fast-food dish not typically served in English take-aways.

Seafood has traditionally accounted for a large proportion of the local diet. Although commercial fishing has declined in recent years, local delicacies include Manx kippers (smoked herring) which are produced by the smokeries in Peel on the west coast of the island. The smokeries also produce other specialities including smoked salmon and bacon.

Crab, lobster and scallops are commercially fished, and the queen scallop ("queenies") is particularly well-regarded, with a light, sweet flavour. Cod, ling and mackerel are often angled for the table, and freshwater trout and salmon can be taken from the local rivers and lakes, supported by the Government fish hatchery at Cornaa.

Cattle, sheep, pigs and poultry are all commercially farmed, with Manx lamb from the hill-farms being a popular dish. The Loaghtan, the indigenous breed of Manx sheep, has a rich, dark meat that has found favour with chefs, featuring in dishes on the BBC's MasterChef series.

Manx cheese has been a particular success, featuring smoked and herb-flavoured varieties, and is stocked by many of the UK's supermarket chains. Manx cheese took bronze medals in the 2005 British Cheese Awards, and sold 578 tonnes over the year. There are not many unique desserts, although the Peel flapjack is a popular one.

Beer is brewed on a commercial scale by Okells Brewery (established in 1850), Bushy's Brewery and Hooded Ram Brewing Company (established in 2013). The island has a beer purity law, resembling the German Reinheitsgebot, dating from 1874.

As of 2019, the Isle of Man also has had a whiskey distillery run by the Manx Whiskey Company.

== Sports ==
The Isle of Man is represented as a nation in the Commonwealth Games and the Island Games and hosted the IV Commonwealth Youth Games in 2011. Manx sports people have won three golds at the Commonwealth Games, the most recent being Mark Cavendish, a professional cyclist, in 2006 in the scratch race. Cavendish has had great success in cycling, having won thirty five stages of the Tour de France to date and the Milan–San Remo classic. The island started the Island Games in 1985, and also hosted the Island Games in 2001.

Isle of Man teams and individuals participate in many sports both on and off the island including rugby union, football, gymnastics, hockey, netball, bowling and cricket. It being an island, many types of watersports are also popular with residents.

=== Motorcycle racing ===
The main international event associated with the island is the Isle of Man Tourist Trophy race, colloquially known as "The TT", which began in 1907. It takes place in late May and early June. The TT is now an international road racing event for motorcycles, which used to be part of the World Championship, and is long considered to be one of the "greatest motorcycle sporting event of the world". Taking place over a two-week period, it has become a festival for motorcycling culture, makes a huge contribution to the island's economy and has become part of Manx identity. For many, the Isle carries the title "road racing capital of the world".

The Manx Grand Prix is a separate motorcycle event for amateurs and private entrants that uses the same 60.70 km (37.72 mi) Snaefell Mountain Course in late August and early September.

=== Cammag ===
Cammag is the national sport of Mann. It is similar to the Irish hurling, and Scottish game of shinty. Once the most popular sport on the island, it ceased to be played by the start of the 20th century. It has more recently been revived with an annual match at St John's.

== See also ==
- Mananan festival
- Registered Buildings of the Isle of Man, which include a number of architectural works and other cultural sites
