= Fenodyree =

Proper name and a class of mythical beings

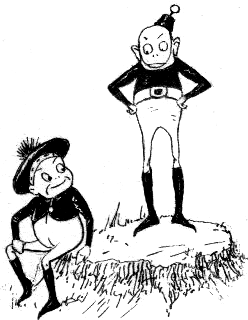
Two brownies, illustrated by Pearson Scott Foresman. Creatures similar to the Fenodyree.

Fenodyree (also phynodderee, phynnodderee, fynnoderee or fenoderee; Manx pronunciation: [fəˈnɑðəɾi] or [fuˈnoːðuɾɪ] (Note: fŭn-ṓ-đŭr-ĭ or fŭn-ṓđ-rĭ according to John Rhys. Rhys's notation was converted into IPA based on P. E. Rogers's paper. See Rhys (1901), p. 2, note 1 on discussion of the Welsh "dd" also written as a symbol "like a Greek delta", and "represented by đ in the Welsh extracts" by Rhys. The symbol "like Greek delta" as occurs in Rhys's Outlines (1894) is called "Gaelic d" by Rogers.) (Note: Also transcribed as "funótheree".)) in the folklore of the Isle of Man, is a hairy supernatural creature, a sort of sprite or fairy (Manx: ferrishyn), often carrying out chores to help humans, like the brownies of the larger areas of Scotland and England.

== Etymology ==
The word Fenodyree consists of Manx words fynney, 'hair, fur' and oashyree, 'stockings', or possibly from Swedish: fjun, lit. 'down'. although this "hairy stockings(?)" etymology may be conjectural. John Rhys observes that oashyr was apparently borrowed from hosur, 'stockings' (pl. of Old Norse: hosa (Note: ON hosa is defined as ""prop. the hose or stocking covering the leg between the knee and ankle, serving as a kind of legging or gaiter")), so if that is the etymology, the word Fenodyree cannot predate contact with the Norsemen.

Fenodyree has also been glossed simply as "the hairy one" or "something hairy" in Manx by Joseph Train and J. F. Campbell after him.

John Kelly's dictionary has suggested an alternate etymology, stemming from fenney, 'invaders, wild Irish'. The term has also been used in the sense of "satyr" in the 1819 Manx translation of the Bible (Isaiah 34:14) by Kelly.

== General description ==
A fenodyree in Manx folklore is considered a kind of fairy (Manx: ferrishyn), covered with copious amounts of body hair, normally conducting itself in a naked state without wearing any clothing. Comparable to Anglo-Scottish brownie, the creature is said to be oftentimes helpful to humans, performing arduous tasks such as transporting great blocks of stone, or clipping meadow grass with stupendous speed.

For his talent in the grass-cutting skill, he has earned the nickname yn foldyr gastey or "the nimble mower", and is sung in a Manx ballad by that very title.

A bit of leftover food was all he asked for reward, according to a ballad: "His was the wizard hand that toil'd / At midnight's witching hour / That gather'd the sheep from the coming storm", and all he required were "scattered sheafs" and "cream-bowl" left on the meal table. In one instance, he accepted the offer to draw water in exchange for a "cake" (griddlecake), but could not accomplish the task because he was given a leaky sieve instead of a pail. On the other hand, a gift of clothing would drive the creature away, as attested in several tales.

Besides herding animals as just mentioned, reaping and threshing overnight may be added to the list of chores he performs for the farmer, as well as herding sheep on a snowy night. The fenodyree may also repair fish-nets or the boat, according to lore among fishermen.

Some writers suggest it was a "giant", or "big and shaggy, with fiery eyes, and stronger than any man", but I. H. Leney (Mrs. J. W. Russell) explains it measured two feet in height, making it a giant among the "Good People" (fairies).

== Folktales ==
A version that collates several of the fairy's labor is "The Fynoderee of Gordon", published in 1911 by Sophia Morrison. This is arguably the best-known tale about the fenodyree.

=== Fallen fairy knight ===
In one tale, the "Phynnodderee" appears as a former fairy (sing. Manx: ferrish; pl. ferrishyn), a Knight of the Fairy Court. He was transformed into a grotesque satyr-like appearance as punishment, after falling in love with a human girl from Glen Aldyn and skipping attendance of the royal high festivities of the harvest (Rehollys vooar yn ouyr, lit. "Great Harvest Moonlight"), held by his own kind at Glen Rushen. (Note: Glen Rushen was within the former Parish of Patrick, not the Parish of Rushen. Glen Rushen lies a few kilometers south of Glen Maye.)

=== Nimble mower ===
A tale attached to a round meadow in the parish of Marown held that a Phynnodderee had a habit of cutting and gathering the meadow grass there with the scythe, until a farmer criticized the job for not mowing the grass close enough to ground. The hairy Phynnodderee then ceased his mowing and "went after him stubbing up the roots so fast that it was with difficulty the farmer escaped having his legs cut off by the angry sprite". No one afterwards could succeed in mowing this meadow till a knight devised a way to start at the center and clip the grass in a circular pattern.

The nickname of the Fenodyree as "The Nimble Mower" (Manx: Yn Foldyr Gastey) has been commemorated in balladry.

=== Herder ===
The fenodyree is reputed to collect the sheep for the shepherd when there is a storm, as sung in verse. (Note: Or a snow-storm, in the segment in "The Fynoderee of Gordon", detailed below.)

Another tale describes the Fenodyree doing the farmer's work of rounding up the wethers (gelded ram sheep) that grazed on Snaefell (mountain) and bringing them into the pen; in the process, the fairy mistakenly brought in a hare which he mistook for a little ram. A rendition of this is incorporated into the story cobbled together published as "The Fynoderee of Gordon" by Sophia Morrison, where the fairy herds the sheep into a "cogee house" (a weaving house), and mingled among the sheep is a big hare he mistook for a Loaghtan. This has been described as "the most notable" exploit by the Fenodyree in Morrison's tale.

=== Stone mover ===
Another taleTrain (1845), pp. 149–151 describes how a gentleman wishing to build a large house "a little above the base of "Snafield mountain" (Snaefell), (Note: Train's text gives "Snafield mountain", but the correct spelling being Snaefell is discussed in one of Moore's books.) at a place called Tholt-e-Will or 'Will's Barn' (in the original tale spelled Sholt-e-will)" (Note: Train (1845), p. 149 originally spells it "Sholt-e-will", but Moore (1891) corrects it to Tholt-e-Eill; and Moore's place-name dictionary gives the following entry: "Soalt (F), 'a barn.' As in Tholt-e-Will, 'Will's Barn'". "Tholt-e-Will Plantation" is the spelling still given in Google maps, located close to "Tholt-y-Will Glen", though other sources spell the plantation as "Tholt-y-Will".) The rocks for building this edifice (including an enormous block of white stone) needed to be quarried from a place near the shore. These were wondrously transported in one night by a phynnodderee. But when the gentleman left a set of clothing as recompense, the hairy one declared "Bayrn da'n chone, dy doogh da'n choine. ('Cap for the head, alas, poor head/ Coat for the back, alas, poor back/ Breeches for the breech, alas, poor breech. / If these be all thine, thine cannot be the merry Glen of Rushen')". In the tale, the hairy phynnodderee subsequently departed in a "melancholy wail", declaring that his voice could thenceforth be heard in the whistling winds of the mountains, mourning the loss of his Fairy Bower.

=== Gift of clothing ===
In the foregoing tale about the Stone mover, the giving of the gift of clothing unwittingly worked as a charm to expel him from the area: as J. F. Campbell says, "he was frightened away by a gift of clothes".

The motif of the disdain for the gift of clothing also occurs in other tales where the fenodyree helps the farmer, and pronounces a similar phrase, "Though this place is thine, the great Glen of Rushen is not", and disappears somewhere. John Rhys supposes that it is to Glen Rushen he has gone off to.

== Parallels ==
J. F. Campbell noted the parallel between the fenodyree frightened away by the gift of clothing in the above example and the long-haired gruagach in the story from Skipness which was frightened away by the offer of a coat and a cap. In the Irish tale recorded by Lady Wilde, the Irish phouka stopped performing the chore of grinding corn and disappeared from the mill once the farmer gave him a coat as a present.

Joseph Train, and later John Rhys among others have pointed out that the fenodyree is akin to Lob Lie-By-The-Fire in English folklore, also known as "Lubber Fiend" from Milton.

== Popular culture ==
- A character in The Weirdstone of Brisingamen (Alan Garner), a young-adult fantasy set in Alderley Edge in Cheshire, is called Fenodyree.
- A character in Beauty by Sheri S. Tepper, who befriends and does magical favors for the titular character.
- Fenodyree is also the name of a small folk band from the Isle of Man.

== See also ==
- Brownie
- Adhene
- Arkan Sonney
- Buggane
- Glashtyn
- Jimmy Squarefoot
- Moddey Dhoo
- Mooinjer veggey
- Sleih beggey
