= Adhene =

Mythical characters of the Isle of Man

In Manx tradition, fairies were called Adhene and known as Cloan ny moyrn, which means the Children of Pride/Ambition, because they were regarded as having been fallen angels cast from heaven but too good for hell. They could be benevolent but were mostly mischievous in association with humans, taking babies or wives when they wished, although it was believed that their powers were not effective over any human on an errand of mercy.

About the size of a small child when visible, they fished at sea and herded their cattle on the hills. The Manx people knew there would be good fishing or harvests when they heard the fairies making storage barrels in the caves.

== See also ==
- Arkan Sonney
- Buggane
- Fairy
- Fenodyree
- Glashtyn
- Jimmy Squarefoot
- Moddey Dhoo
- Mooinjer veggey
- Sleih beggey

== Sources ==
- Rose, Carol (1998). Spirits, Fairies, Leprechauns, and Goblins - An Encyclopedia. W. W. Norton & Company. ISBN 9780393317923.
