= Moddey Dhoo =

Legendary Manx ghost-dog

The Moddey Dhoo (Manx: [ˈmoːdðə dðuː] or Manx: [ˈmaːdə 'duː], meaning "black dog" in Manx) is a phantom black dog in Manx folklore that reputedly haunted Peel Castle on the west coast of the Isle of Man.

== Nomenclature ==
The Manx name Moddey Dhoo was mis-transcribed as Mauthe Doog (/ˈmɔːðə doʊɡ/) by an influential 18th-Century English-speaking folklore source, which led to a history of misspellings of the proper name.

This heterography "Mauthe Doog" carried over from old printing is confusing, but Manx Celtic "doog" does not mean "dog", rather, the orthography of "dhoo" means "black". While Manx moddey is the term for "dog".

== Legend ==
The English topographer and poet George Waldron seems to be the sole definitive written authority of this folklore localized in the castle. Waldron transcribes the original Manx name "Moddey Dhoo" as "Mauthe Doog", and describes the dog thus:

They say, that an apparition called, in their language, the Mauthe Doog, in the shape of a large black spaniel with curled shaggy hair, was used to haunt Peel Castle; and has been frequently seen in every room, but particularly in the guard-chamber, where, as soon as candles were lighted, it came and lay down before the fire in presence of all the soldiers, who at length, by being so much accustomed to the sight of it, lost great part of the terror they were seized with at its first appearance.

— George Waldron, History and Description of the Isle of Man (1st ed. 1731) 1744 edition, p.23

There used to be a passage connected to the Peel Castle, traversing the church grounds, leading to the apartment of the Captain of the Guard, and "the Mauthe Doog was always seen to come from that passage at the close of day, and return to it again as soon as the morning dawned".

Waldron reports that one drunken guard of the castle, who in defiance of the dog, went against the usual procedure of locking up the castle gate in pairs and did this all alone. Emboldened by liquor, he "snatched up the keys" when it wasn't even his turn to do so. The watchman after locking up was supposed to use the haunted passage to deliver the keys to the captain. Some noises were heard, the adventurer returned to the guard-room, ghastly frightened, unable to share the story of what he had seen, and died three days later.

That was the last sighting of the dog. But the passage was sealed up and never used again after the haunting, and a different pathway constructed.

The dog was made known to the world at large when Sir Walter Scott introduced the "Manthe Dog -- a fiend, or demon, in the shape of a large, shaggy, black mastiff" in Peveril of the Peak (1823), an installment of his Waverley novels. Here he freely adapted the folklore to suit his plot, but Scott derived knowledge of this folklore through Waldron's work, as he candidly gave credit in his "author's notes". Scott took liberty to scale up the size of the dog in his novel.

== Modern sightings ==
Moddey Dhoo hotspots on the Isle of Man

William Walter Gill (d. 1963), has preserved some of the local lore regarding the Black Dog appearing around the Manx landscape, as well as firsthand eyewitness accounts:

A field near Ballamodda, near a field named Robin y Gate, "Robin of the Road," was haunted by an "ordinary moddey dhoo," as opposed to Ballagilbert Glen (aka Kinlye's Glen), where stood a farmhouse on the east side, and in the lane leading to it "lurked a moddey dhoo, headless like that at Hango".

Gill also reports sightings of Moddey Dhoo at a spot called "Milntown corner" close to Ramsey. In 1927, a friend saw it turning towards Glen Auldyn, and it was "black, with long shaggy hair, with eyes like coals of fire," and a doctor while driving on the road beyond the corner in 1931 encountered "a big black dog-like creature nearly the size of a calf, with bright staring eyes".

As to the version where the black dog is described "as big as a calf and with eyes like pewter plates" this seems to derive from a report of a modern sighting of the calf-sized dog, combined with the description of the eyes of a troll in Asbjornsen and Moe's Norwegian folktale collection.

== In popular culture ==
A Moddey Dhoo features in Tom Siddell's Gunnerkrigg Court as a psychopomp, one of the many spirit guides that assist the dead with their transition.

"Mauthe Doog" appears in the video game Fire Emblem: The Sacred Stones as an enemy unit class.

"Mauthe Doog," a species of faerie canine, appear in Seanan McGuire's October Daye series.

== See also ==
- Adhene
- Arkan Sonney
- Buggane
- Castle Rushen
- Fenodyree
- Glashtyn
- Jimmy Squarefoot
- Mooinjer veggey
- Sleih beggey
