= Arkan sonney =

Manx term for hedgehog

Arkan sonney (/ˈɑːrkən ˈsɒni/; Manx pronunciation: ['aːrkan ˈsonə], literally "lucky urchin" or "plentiful little pig") is the Manx term for hedgehog. The arkan sonney is a type of fairy animal that takes the form of a white pig that brings good fortune to those who manage to catch it. It was even considered a favourable omen just to have seen the "lucky piggy". It was also said that if you caught one you would always find a silver coin in your pocket. However, holding on to it for too long will result in bad fortune.

In Fairy Tales From the Isle of Man (1951) by Dora Broome, the white pig is described as having red eyes and ears, and though it can alter its size it is not able to change its shape. Theresa Bane describes the pig in a similar way, without mention of red eyes.

== See also ==
- Adhene
- Buggane
- Fenodyree
- Glashtyn
- Jimmy Squarefoot
- Moddey Dhoo
- Mooinjer veggey
- Sleih beggey
