= Jimmy Squarefoot =

Legendary bipedal pig-headed creature from Manx folklore

In Manx folklore, Jimmy Squarefoot is a legendary bipedal pig-headed creature living on the Isle of Man.

== Folklore ==
Jimmy Squarefoot is typically described as a man with the head of a pig with large tusks or as a large white boar. He is thought to have once been ridden by an unnamed Foawr, a type of stone-throwing giant, living on Cronk yn Irree Lhaa who may have been the husband of the Caillagh ny Groamagh. Cailleach and her husband, after a fight, vanished and left their pet boar, which later became Jimmy Squarefoot.

Jimmy Squarefoot is said to live in the hills of Arbory and Malew, mainly near the bridge over the Grenaby river. He is said to have a cave near South Barrule, and takes humans through it to the underworld. Jimmy Squarefoot may also be linked with the story of a buggane in Rushen which was able to transform between a man and a black pig.

The name "Jimmy Squarefoot" was also used by sailors to refer to the devil during the late 1800s and early 1900s.

== Popular culture ==
Jimmy Squarefoot is also the name of Monster in My Pocket #80 as well as a character in the 2007 PlayStation 3 video game Folklore.

== See also ==
- Adhene
- Arkan Sonney
- Buggane
- Fenodyree
- Glashtyn
- Moddey Dhoo
- Mooinjer veggey
- Sleih beggey

== Sources ==
- Douglas, Mona (1930). "Animals in Manx Folklore and Song". Jubilee Congress of the Folk-lore Society, Sept. 19-Sept. 25, 1928: Papers and Transactions. Folklore Society (Great Britain).
- Gill, W. Walter (1929). "Place-names and Place-lore". A Manx Scrapbook. Bristol: J. W. Arrowsmith Ltd.
- Gill, W.W. (1963). "Dialect Words and Phrases". A Third Manx Scrapbook. Bristol: Arrowsmiths.
- Harper's Young People. Harper & Brothers. 1892.
- Whitney, William Dwight (1910). The Century Dictionary and Cyclopedia: An Encyclopedic Lexicon of the English Language and a Pronouncing and Etymological Dictionary of Names in Geography, Biography, Mythology, History, Art, Etc., Together with Atlas of the World. Century Company.
