= Sleih beggey =

Umbrella term for Manx fairies

Sleih beggey /sleɪˈbɛɡɑː/ (Manx for Little people, also Beggys, Sleigh veggy, Sleigh beggey, and Ferrishyn from the English: faeries) is the umbrella term for Manx fairies.

== Descriptions ==
A wide variety of individual mythical creatures come under the umbrella of sleih beggey, with both benevolent and malevolent fairies.

Generally, the Sleih beggey are seen as stocky in stature, and as domestic fairies, who lived in burghs. They are fond of hunting, music, and abducting humans. They dislike ashes, artificial light, salt, and baptisms. They commonly wore green clothes. Many were also known to steal babies, and in doing so getting into fights with humans.

John Rhys noted that Manx and Welsh fairies were similar in most aspects, but that Manx fairies had no issue using weapons to attack humans, unlike the Welsh fairies.

The Ferrish have been described as a particular tribe of fairies, standing between one and three foot tall, who rode horses and kept dogs for hunting, having no named king or queen. They were known to replace human babies with changelings, as with many other fairies in the British Isles and Ireland.

== In media ==
In the manga and anime The Ancient Magus' Bride, the Sleigh Beggy are a special type of mage.

== See also ==
- Arkan Sonney
- Adhene
- Fenodyree
- Glashtyn
- Leprechaun
- Kobold
- Tuatha Dé Danann
- Aos Sí
- Buggane
- Jimmy Squarefoot
- Moddey Dhoo
