= Peveril of the Peak =

1823 novel by Walter Scott

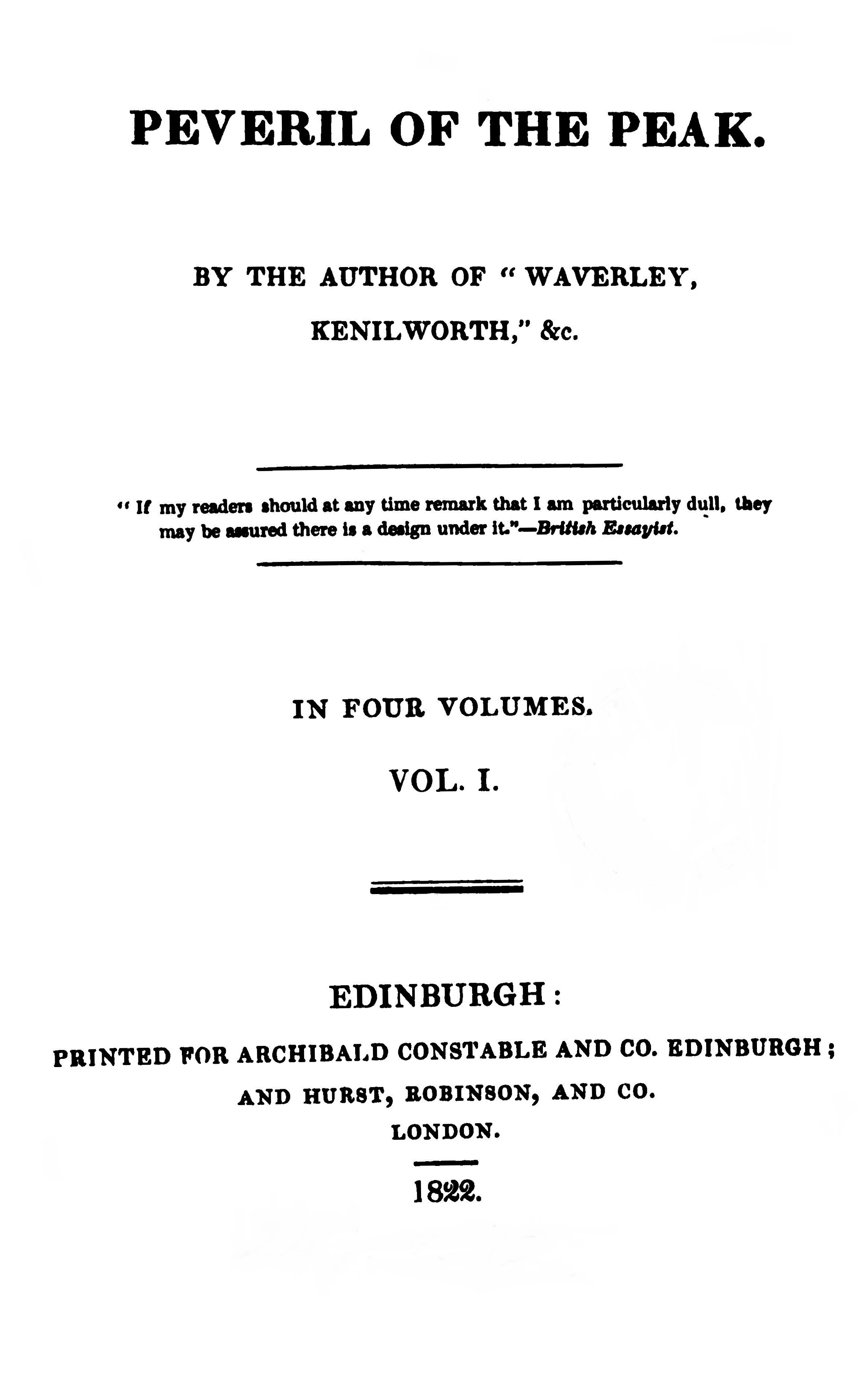
- Author: Walter Scott
- Language: English
- Series: Waverley novels
- Genre: Historical novel
- Publisher: Archibald Constable and Co. (Edinburgh); Hurst, Robinson, and Co. (London)
- Publication date: 1823
- Publication place: Scotland
- Media type: Print
- Pages: 495 (Edinburgh Edition, 2007)
- Preceded by: The Fortunes of Nigel
- Followed by: Quentin Durward

Peveril of the Peak (1823) is the longest novel by Walter Scott. Along with Ivanhoe, Kenilworth, and Woodstock this is one of the English novels in the Waverley novels series, with the main action taking place around 1678 in the Peak District, the Isle of Man, and London, and centring on the Popish Plot.

== Plot introduction ==
Julian Peveril, a Cavalier, is in love with Alice Bridgenorth, a Roundhead's daughter, but both he and his father are accused of involvement with the Popish Plot of 1678.

Most of the story takes place in Derbyshire, London, and on the Isle of Man. The title refers to Peveril Castle in Castleton, Derbyshire.

== Composition and sources ==
On 25 February 1822 Scott informed his Edinburgh publisher Archibald Constable that he was thinking of writing a novel about the Popish Plot. He seems to have begun composition of Peveril of the Peak immediately after completing The Fortunes of Nigel at the beginning of May and the first volume was complete by mid-July. Thereafter progress slowed, and the second volume was not finished until October: much of Scott's summer was taken up with arranging and superintending George IV's visit to Scotland, and he was deeply distressed at the death of his close friend William Erskine on 14 August. It had been intended that Peveril should be in the normal three volumes, but by mid-October Scott was proposing to extend it to a fourth volume, in the belief that the third volume was turning out better than the first two and that he would hope to sustain this improvement into a fourth. Composition was now up to speed again; indeed, it became frenetic. By 14 December the third volume was complete and the fourth well under way, and the novel was finished before Christmas.

Scott's knowledge of the Restoration period was very likely unequalled. He had amassed a unique collection of tracts and pamphlets relating to the Plot. He had edited both the Memoirs of Count Grammont (Anthony Hamilton) in 1811 and the collection known as Somers' Tracts, which had appeared in 13 volumes between 1809 and 1815. Several historical studies of the period published after 1700 were also in his library and proved invaluable quarries: Bishop Burnet's History of his Own Time by Gilbert Burnet (1724‒34); Examen by Roger North (1740); The History of England by David Hume (originally published in 1754‒62; and Memoirs, Illustrative of the Life and Writings of John Evelyn, edited by William Bray (1818). For the Isle of Man, which he never visited, Scott had memories of lost notes prepared by his brother Tom, as well as two works in his collection: A Description of the Isle of Man by George Waldron (1731) and An Account of the Isle of Man by William Sacherevell (1702). For Restoration London an invaluable source was A Survey of the Cities of London and Westminster by John Stow, of which Scott owned the revised edition by John Strype published in 1720.

== Editions ==
The first edition was published in Edinburgh on 7 January 1823, and appeared in London on the 22nd, after frustrating delays caused by stormy weather. As with all the Waverley novels before 1827 publication was anonymous. The print run was 10,000, and the price two guineas (£2 2s or £2.10). There is no reason to think that Scott was involved with the novel again until the late summer of 1830, when he revised the text and provided new notes and an introduction for the 'Magnum' edition, in which it appeared as Volumes 28, 29 and 30 in September, October, and November 1831.

The standard modern edition, by Alison Lumsden, was published in 2007 as Volume 14 of the Edinburgh Edition of the Waverley Novels: it is based on the first edition with emendations mainly from Scott's manuscript; the Magnum material is included in Volume 25b.

== Plot summary ==
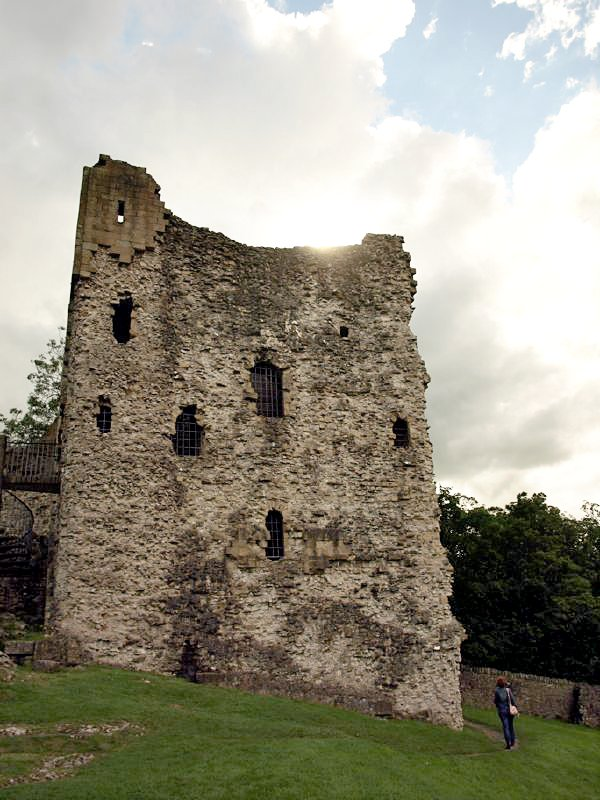
The keep of Peveril Castle

Sir Geoffrey Peveril and Major Bridgenorth had been boys together; and although they adopted different views in religion and politics, the major's influence had saved the Royalist's life after the battle of Bolton-le-Moors, and Lady Peveril had brought up his motherless girl, Alice, with her own son. After the Restoration, the Countess of Derby, who, through treachery, had suffered a long imprisonment by the Roundheads, sought protection at Martindale Castle, where Bridgenorth would have arrested her for having caused his brother-in-law, William Christian, to be shot as a traitor, had not the knight interfered by tearing up the warrant, and escorting her through Cheshire on her return to the Isle of Man. Alice was of course withdrawn from his wife's care, and it was supposed the major had emigrated to New England. Several years afterwards Sir Geoffrey's son Julian became the companion of the young earl, and, with the nurse Deborah's connivance, renewed his intimacy with his foster sister, who was under the care of her widowed aunt, Dame Christian. At one of the secret interviews between them, they were surprised by the entrance of her father, who related some of his religious experiences, and vaguely hinted that his consent to their marriage was not impossible. The next night, having undertaken to proceed to London, to clear the countess and her son from the suspicion of being concerned in Titus Oates's pretended Popish plot, Julian was conducted to a sloop by Fenella, his patron's deaf and dumb dwarf, and, as she was being taken ashore against her will while he was asleep, he dreamt that he heard Alice's voice calling for his help.

At Liverpool he met Topham with a warrant against Sir Geoffrey, and on his way to the Peak to warn him, he travelled with Edward Christian, passing as Ganlesse, a priest, who led him to an inn, where they supped with Chiffinch, a servant of Charles II. On reaching Martindale Castle, he found his father and mother in the custody of Roundheads, and he was taken by Bridgenorth as a prisoner to Moultrassie Hall, where Alice received them, and he recognised Ganlesse among a number of Puritan visitors. During the night the Hall was attacked by the dependents and miners of the Peveril estate, and, having regained his liberty, Julian started, with Lance as his servant, in search of his parents, who he ascertained were on their way to London in charge of Topham. At an inn where they halted, Julian overheard Chiffinch revealing to a courtier a plot against Alice, and that he had been robbed of the papers entrusted to him by the countess, which, however, he managed to recover the next morning.

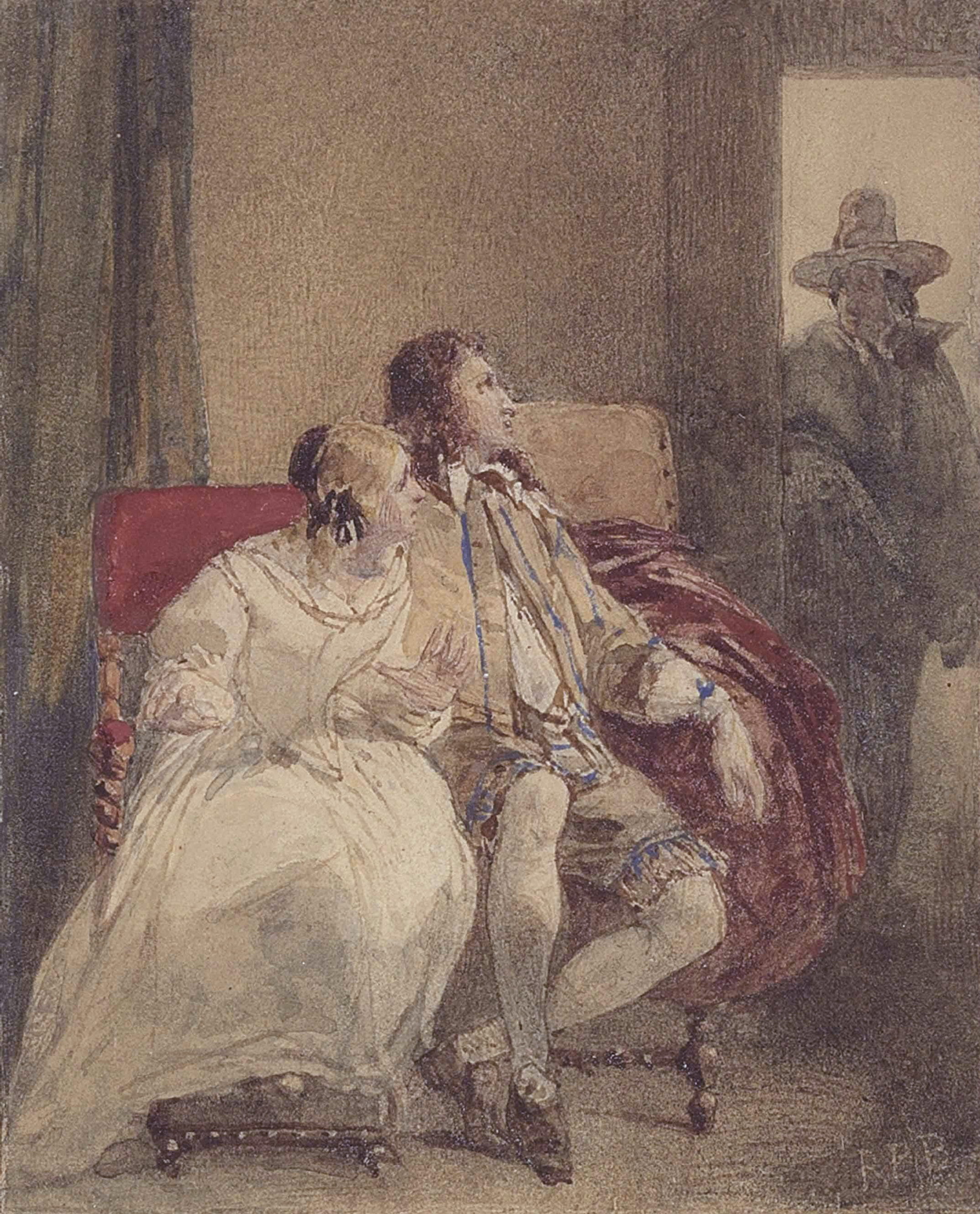
Julian Peveril and Alice Bridgenorth, surprised by Major Ralph Bridgenorth (Richard Parkes Bonington, ca. 1826)

Meanwhile, Christian, under whose care Bridgenorth had placed his daughter, communicated to the Duke of Buckingham a design he had formed of introducing her to Charles II, and, at an interview with her father, endeavoured to persuade him to abandon the idea of marrying her to young Peveril. Having reached London, Julian met Fenella, who led him into St. James's Park, where she attracted the notice of the king by dancing, and he sent them both to await his return at Chiffinch's apartments. Alice was already under the care of Mistress Chiffinch, and escaped from an interview with the duke to find herself in the presence of Charles and her lover, with whom, after he had placed the countess's papers in the king's hands, she was allowed to depart. Julian, however, lost her in a street fray, and having been committed to Newgate for wounding his assailant, he was placed in the same cell with the queen's dwarf, and conversed with an invisible speaker. After startling Christian with the news that his niece had disappeared, the duke bribed Colonel Blood to intercept his movements, so that he might not discover where she was, and was then himself astonished at finding Fenella instead of Alice, who had been captured by his servants in his house, and at her equally unexpected defiance of and escape from him.

A few days afterwards, Sir Geoffrey Peveril, his son and the dwarf were tried for aiding and abetting Oates's Plot; but after nearly three years and the execution of at least fifteen innocent men, opinion had begun to turn against Oates. The last high-profile victim of the climate of suspicion was Oliver Plunkett, Archbishop of Armagh, whose unjust slaughter is retold by Scott with no small dose of bitterness. Sir Geoffrey, his son and the dwarf are, at length, all acquitted. In order, however, to avoid the mob, they take refuge in a room, where they encounter Bridgenorth, who convinces Julian that they are in his power, and allows Christian to propose to the Duke of Buckingham that several hundred Fifth-Monarchy men, led by Colonel Blood, should seize the king, and proclaim his Grace Lord-Lieutenant of the kingdom. The same afternoon Charles has just granted an audience to the Countess of Derby, when the dwarf emerges from a violoncello case and reveals the conspiracy which Fenella had enabled him to overhear. It then transpires that Bridgenorth had released the Peverils, and that Christian had trained his daughter Fenella, whose real name was Zarah, to feign being deaf and dumb, in order that she might act as his spy; but that her secret love for Julian had frustrated the execution of his vengeance against the countess. He is allowed to leave the country, and the major, who on recovering Alice by Fenella's aid, had placed her under Lady Peveril's care, having offered to restore some of Sir Geoffrey's domains which had passed into his hands as her dowry, the king's recommendation secures the old knight's consent to the marriage which within a few weeks unites the Martindale-Moultrassie families and estates.

== Characters ==
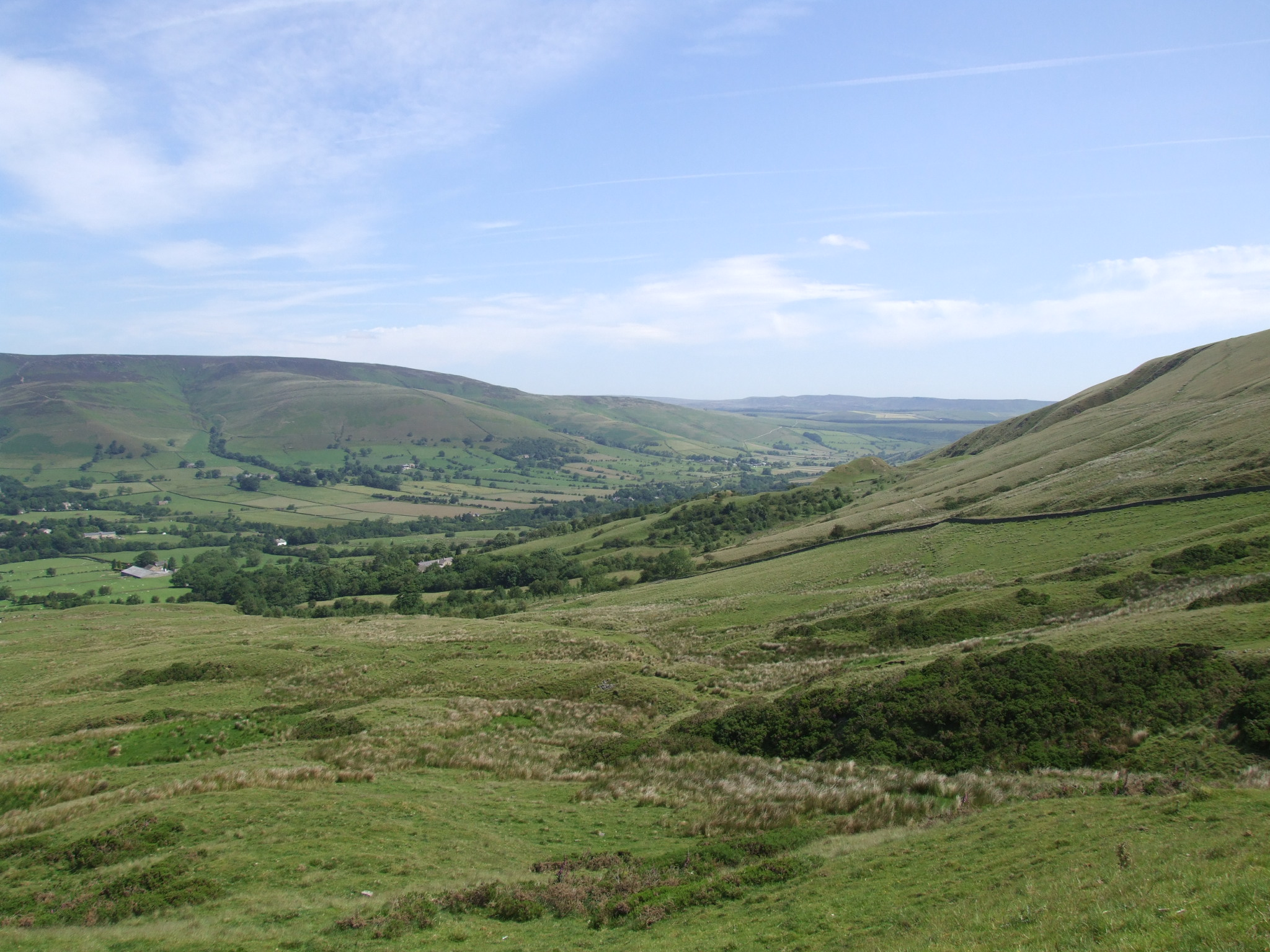
Vale of Edale in Derbyshire, north of Peveril Castle

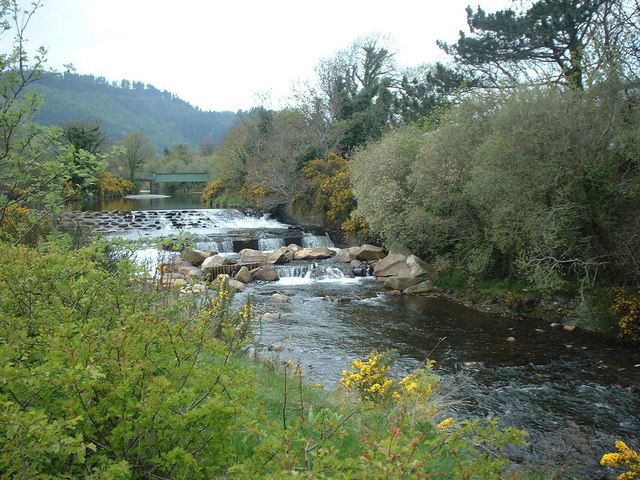
Sulby River, Isle of Man

Principal characters in bold

- **Sir Geoffrey Peveril**, of Martindale Castle
- Lady Margaret, his wife
- **Julian Peveril**, their son
- Lance Outram, their gamekeeper
- Whitaker, their steward
- Mistress Ellesmere, their housekeeper
- **Major Bridgenorth**, of Moultrassie Hall, a Puritan
- **Alice**, his daughter
- **Deborah Debbitch**, her nurse
- Rev. Nehemiah Solsgrace, a Presbyterian minister
- Dr Dummerar, an Anglican clergyman
- **Charlotte, Countess of Derby**
- **Philip, Earl of Derby**, her son
- **Edward Christian**, alias Richard Ganlesse, a Dempster of Man
- **Fenella**, alias Zarah, his daughter
- Sir Jasper Cranborne, a Cavalier
- Charles Topham, officer of the Black Rod
- Captain Dangerfield, his associate
- John Whitecraft, a Cheshire innkeeper
- Mrs Whitecraft, his wife
- Roger Raine, landlord of the Peveril Arms
- Mrs Raine, his widow
- Matthew Chamberlain, her counsellor
- **Chiffinch**, alias Will Smith, servant to Charles II
- **Mistress Chiffinch**, his wife
- **George Villiers, 2nd Duke of Buckingham**
- Jerningham, his secretary
- King Charles II
- Empson, a Court musician
- Master Maulstatute a Justice of the Peace
- **Sir Geoffrey Hudson**, the Queen's dwarf
- James Butler, 1st Duke of Ormond
- Colonel Blood, an adventurer

== Chapter summary ==
Prefatory Letter: Dr Dryasdust informs Captain Clutterbuck that he believes he has received a visit in York from the Author of Waverley, newly elected to the bibliophilic Roxburghe Club in London, who defended his novels against charges of perverting and usurping serious history.

Volume One

Ch. 1: In 1658 the Presbyterian Bridgenorth loses his wife in childbirth and in his depression hands the newly-born girl over to be brought up by Sir Geoffrey and Lady Peveril, the families having assisted each other during the changing fortunes of the Civil War.

Ch. 2: Bridgenorth accepts the Restoration in 1660, and, although his spirits have revived to a considerable extent, it is agreed that little Alice should continue to live at Martindale Castle, where she has endeared herself to young Julian Peveril. Bridgenorth agrees to encourage his friends to attend a feast of reconciliation organised by Lady Peveril.

Ch. 3: Lady Peveril and her steward Whitaker prepare for the feast.

Ch. 4: The feast takes place after separate routes of approach to the Castle, leading to separate rooms, have been agreed between the opposing factions and two contrasting sermons have been delivered.

Ch. 5: On the morning after the feast the Countess of Derby appears, having spent a night unannounced at the Castle. Bridgenorth is outraged that after her recovery of the Isle of Man from the disloyal William Christian she arranged his execution. He attempts to arrest her.

Ch. 6: Lady Peveril places Bridgenorth under temporary detention to enable the Countess to pursue her journey to Liverpool in safety. Sir Geoffrey returns and arranges for the Countess to be escorted on her way, the more urgently because it is discovered that Bridgenorth has escaped.

Ch. 7: The keeper Lance Outram tells Whitaker that, the same morning, he saw Bridgenorth meeting Alice's nurse Deborah. On the road, Sir Geoffrey repels Bridgenorth's attempt to execute a warrant for the Countess's arrest.

Ch. 8: Lady Peveril receives a letter from Bridgenorth announcing that he plans to leave Derbyshire and has withdrawn Alice and Deborah to accompany him. Sir Geoffrey is unable to resist the temptation to expel the Presbyterian minister Solsgrace in favour of the Anglican Dr Dummerar with offensive haste.

Ch. 9: Solsgrace rebukes Bridgenorth for associating with Sir Geoffrey. Bridgenorth rejects Sir Geoffrey's offer of a duel, delivered by Sir Jasper Cranbourne, as the honourable way of settling their differences.

Ch. 10: Five years pass. While taking a shortcut through the Moultrassie Hall grounds Lady Peveril is surprised to encounter Bridgenorth, who had left Derbyshire shortly after rejecting her husband's challenge. His language is apocalyptic, advocating renewed civil war, and he is intent on avenging the executed Christian. Julian is sent to share the education of the young Earl of Derby on the Isle of Man.

Ch. 11: On the island, Julian and the bored Derby chat, and Julian approaches Deborah at the Black Fort with the aim of seeing Alice.

Ch. 12: A retrospective chapter fills in the background to Julian's visit to the Fort: after a series of previous meetings with Alice there, he had returned to Derbyshire to ask his father's approval of their marriage, but his mother's indication of the hostility Sir Geoffrey's feels towards Bridgenorth dissuaded him, and when he told Alice of this she declined to see him again.

Volume Two

Ch. 1 (13): A fraught interview with Alice is unexpectedly interrupted by Bridgenorth, whose words to Julian give hints of encouragement.

Ch. 2 (14): After a pleasant conversation walking with Julian, Bridgenorth tells how, during his time in New England he had witnessed Richard Whalley inspiring villagers to repel an attack by Indians. He speaks calmly of the need for such a voice in the present state of England, and for sustained political commitment on Julian's part if he is to be acceptable as Alice's suitor.

Ch. 3 (15): Derby explains to Julian that the family have moved to Peel Castle from Rushin because of the new danger posed by Edward Christian and Bridgenorth consequent on the linking of the Countess with the Popish Plot. Julian receives a letter from Alice asking him to meet her at Goddard Cronnan's Stone.

Ch. 4 (16): Ignoring the mute protests of the Countess's train-bearer Fenella, Julian goes to the Stone.

Ch. 5 (17): Alice warns Julian against her father's attempt to involve him in his political intrigues. Their conference is again interrupted by Bridgenorth, who repeats to Julian that if he is to woo Alice he must fall in with his project.

Ch. 6 (18): Fenella (who Julian fears may be attracted to him) conducts him to the Countess, who tells him that she is under suspicion of involvement in the Popish Plot and accepts his offer to go to London to communicate with her supporters there.

Ch. 7 (19): Julian takes leave of the Countess and after a troubled night is conducted to his boat by Fenella. She insists on staying on board, but while he sleeps during the voyage to Liverpool she is removed.

Ch. 8 (20): The captain tells Julian about Fenella's origins as a rope-dancer's apprentice acquired by the Countess at Ostend. At Liverpool he buys a horse, but he surrenders it to the parliamentary officer Topham before proceeding with an inferior mount to the Cat and Fiddle inn near Altringham.

Ch. 9 (21): At the inn Julian and a fellow traveller, who identifies himself as Ganlesse, have a literary conversation. As they leave, the landlady warns Julian to beware of entrapments, and on the road he refuses to confide in Ganlesse, who appears surprisingly acquainted with his business.

Ch.10 (22): At the next inn Julian, along with Ganlesse and his companion Will Smith, enjoys an excellent meal prepared by the cook Chaubert.

Ch. 11 (23): In parting from Julian, Ganlesse warns him he would have done better to confide in him. Arriving at Martindale Castle, Julian finds Topham preparing to remove his parents to London and leaves under short-term parole with Bridgenorth.

Volume Three

Ch. 1 (24): At Moultrassie Hall, Julian finds Ganlesse among a group of worshipping Puritans. He rejects Bridgeworth's offer of freedom involving exile from England.

Ch. 2 (25): Alerted by Deborah, Lance Outram recruits local miners and attacks Moultrassie Hall. Julian mediates at Alice's request.

Ch. 3 (26): Bridgenorth tells Julian that Alice is to be entrusted to the care of Ganlesse. Julian agrees that Lance should accompany him to London.

Ch. 4 (27): In an inn Julian overhears an inebriated Will Smith, now revealed as Chiffinch, disclose to Lord Saville a plan to use Alice to supplant the Duchess of Portsmouth in the King's favour. He mentions that he had replaced the Countess's documents in Julian's packet with plain paper. Next morning Saville dispatches a messenger to London, and Julian and Lance overpower Chiffinch and Chaubert on the road, recovering the Countess's documents.

Ch. 5 (28): At his levee Buckingham discusses with Edward Christian (hitherto Ganlesse) the plot to displace the Duchess of Portsmouth. Left alone, he plans that Alice should submit to his attentions before becoming the King's mistress.

Ch. 6 (29): Christian persuades Bridgenorth not to seek out Alice, and they debate how to proceed against the Countess's faction. (The narrator sketches Christian's character and motives, and clarifies the plot of the novel.)

Ch. 7 (30): When he is about to deliver a letter from the Countess to the Jesuit Fenwicke at the Savoy, Julian is diverted by Fenella to St James's Park, where she dances before Charles. When Julian indicates that they are associated with the Countess, Charles instructs his musician Empson to conduct them to Mrs Chiffinch's apartments.

Ch. 8 (31): (The narrator fills in Alice's journey to London and installation at Chiffinch's.) Charles arrives at Chiffinch's, and Alice rushes in to escape Buckingham's advances, throwing herself on the King's protection. Julian secures Charles's promise to help his parents as far as possible, and gives him the Countess's packet before escorting Alice away.

Ch. 9 (32): Julian is involved in a fight defending Alice from the attentions of two fops, wounds one of them, and is committed to Newgate by Maulstatute, a Justice of the Peace. The other fop takes Alice off to Buckingham's York House.

Ch. 10 (33): On his arrival at Newgate a misunderstanding results in Julian's sharing a cell with Sir Geoffrey Hudson, the Queen's dwarf.

Ch. 11 (34): Hudson expatiates to Julian on a variety of topics, mostly autobiographical.

Ch. 12 (35): Julian hears a mysterious voice offering him help, but ceasing when he refuses to promise to forget Alice.

Volume Four

Ch. 1 (36): Julian finds an anonymous note indicating that if he wears a white ribbon he will be rescued on his river journey to the Tower, but he refuses to avail himself of this and is conveyed to his intended destination.

Ch. 2 (37): Buckingham tells his secretary Jerningham that he is now reconciled with the Duchess of Portsmouth and intends to give up Christian and the scheme for Alice's advancement, keeping her out of the King's sight.

Ch. 3 (38): Buckingham informs Christian that Alice and Julian have left for Derbyshire, and Christian decides to pursue them. Buckingham then directs Colonel Blood to prevent Christian returning to London.

Ch. 4 (39): Buckingham discovers that the woman detained at York House is not Alice, but an enchanting eastern maiden called Zarah. She escapes his advances by darting out of a window.

Ch. 5 (40): The Chiffinches discuss tactics for retaining the King's favour. During a pause at the Tower on a royal river outing, Buckingham insults an aged warder, leading to his death, and the Duke of Ormond pleads the Peverils' case with the King.

Ch. 6 (41): The Peverils and Hudson are tried for participation in the Popish Plot and acquitted.

Ch. 7 (42): On leaving the court the Peverils are involved in a skirmish with a Protestant mob and take refuge at a cutler's where Bridgenorth appears.

Ch. 8 (43): Julian rebuts his father's criticism of Bridgenorth, who takes him to eavesdrop on a conventicle of activists and deploys extremist rhetoric himself. Christian arrives to forward the conspiracy against the King.

Ch. 9 (44): Christian persuades Buckingham to join the conspiracy. Buckingham receives a summons to attend Court.

Ch. 10 (45): The Countess appears at Court, where Charles tries to restrain her demand for justice as imprudent.

Ch. 11 (46): Hudson emerges from a 'cello and gives news of the conspiracy. Charles prepares to receive Buckingham.

Ch. 12 (47): On his way to Court, Buckingham is warned by a singer but decides to face the storm. Bridgenorth rejects Christian's advice to flee, and Zarah (now identified as Fenella his [alleged] niece) his proposal that she become Buckingham's wife.

Ch. 13 (48): Charles interrogates Buckingham.

Ch. 14 (49): Charles pardons Buckingham and establishes by experiment that Zarah's apparent impairment is assumed. Christian declares her to be his own daughter, rather than his executed brother's, and is sentenced to exile. Bridgenorth also leaves England, resigning the lands of Peveril to Julian and Alice.

== Reception ==
Peveril of the Peak divided critical opinion. Half the reviewers thought highly of it, noting especially the richness of the incidents and the variety of the characters. All of the characters had many admirers, with the exception of Sir Geoffrey Hudson who was almost universally judged an excrescence, even by critics otherwise favourably disposed to the work. Fenella fascinated several reviewers, but rather more thought that she was generally improbable, or at any rate that she became less convincing as the story progressed. Several of the other characters provoked diametrically opposed assessments: thus Bridgenorth was either masterly or hopelessly inconsistent, the lovers were either unusually spirited or vapid, and Buckingham and Christian also divided opinion. The novel was praised for its picture of the age, though some found the period unrewarding or distasteful. The plot was either unusually skilful or typically confused. Those reviewers who were generally hostile objected to the money-making four-volume format, with the repetition and inflation of material from earlier novels in the series. The scene with Ganlesse and Smith in the inn was almost universally praised. Several of the reviewers doubted if their critical labours served much purpose, since readers had by now made their minds up as to the merits of this author, and the novels were read by everyone soon after publication.

== Allusions and references ==
The character of Fenella, a deaf and dumb fairy-like attendant of the Countess of Derby, was suggested by Goethe's Mignon in Wilhelm Meister's Apprenticeship. The hiding of the Countess of Derby in the novel was based on the story of Mrs. Macfarlane which took place around 1716.

"Peak-haunting Peveril" is one of many topical references in "The Heavy Dragoon Song" from Gilbert and Sullivan's Patience (opera).

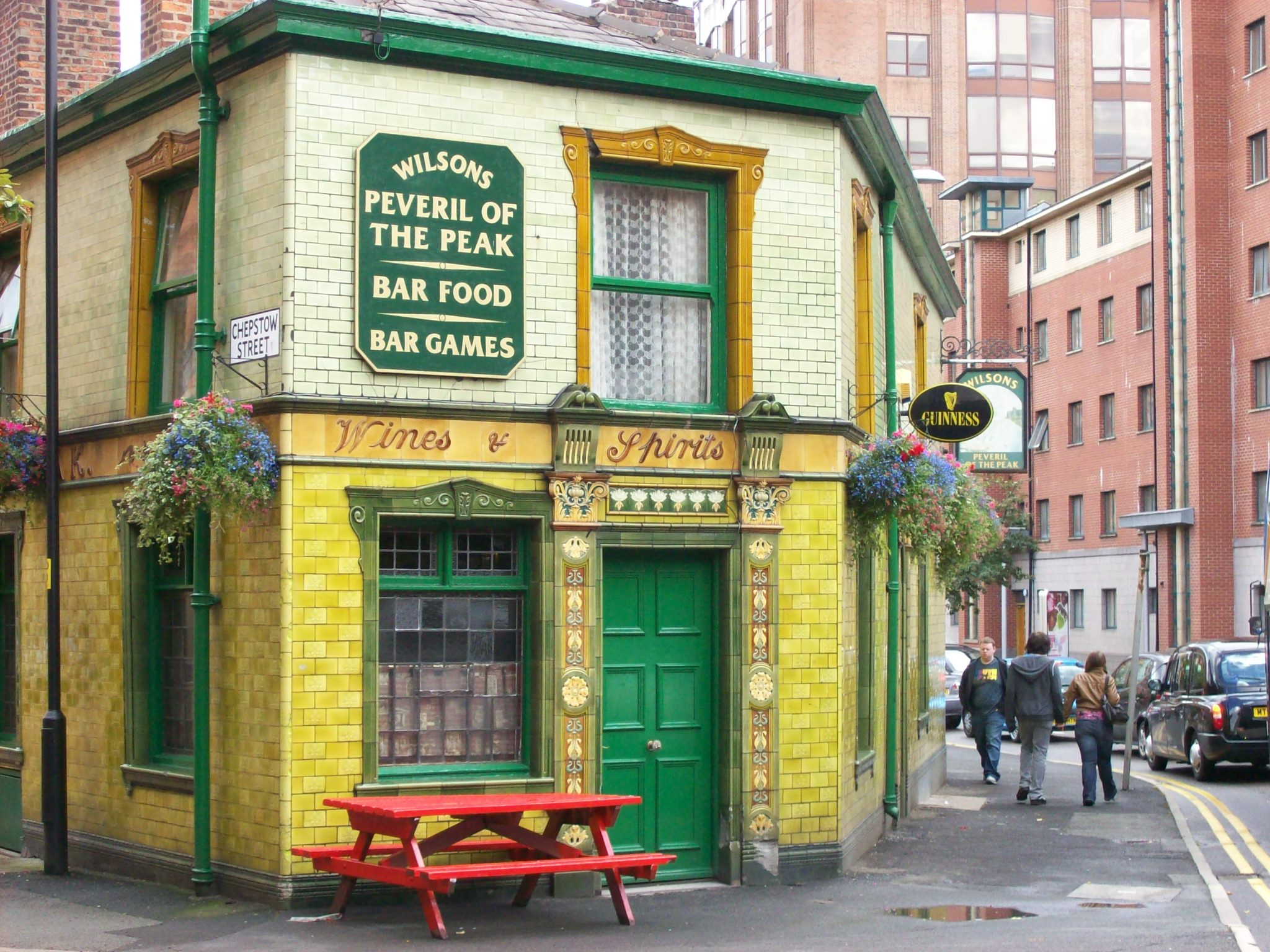
The Peveril of the Peak pub is in Manchester

The Peveril of the Peak pub is in Manchester city centre, which may have been named after the novel.
