= M. L. Wood =

Manx organist and music teacher

M. L. Wood (1839–1925) was an organist and music teacher on the Isle of Man, considered the "Mother of Manx Music." In addition to popularizing musical education on the island, Wood founded the Manx Music Festival, which continues to this day.

== Early life ==
M. L. Wood was born Mary Louisa Wood in 1839, in London's Doughty Street. Her father worked for a philanthropic society there. She attended school, but received no formal music education during her time in London. However, she was strongly influenced by musical performances she attended while living there, including by the opera singers Jenny Lind and Clara Novello.

In 1857, Wood's family, seeking a quiet, affordable lifestyle, migrated to the Isle of Man. There, she began studying music, a pupil of Edmund Hart Turpin in London, learning to play the organ, which became her signature instrument.

Wood held the organ performance diplomas ACO and LTCL.

== Career ==
Wood then began to teach music herself, becoming a certified evangelist of the Tonic sol-fa system by 1867, with her class sizes eventually swelling to over 100 members. A devoted member of the Church of England, she also worked as a church organist, including as the first organist at Peel Cathedral and later at Braddan Church.

She is known as "the Mother of Manx Music" for her contribution to cultural life on the island. Though based in Douglas, she taught singing all across the isle for more than 50 years, and had an enormous influence on Manx church and popular music.

In 1892, she established the Manx Music Festival, also known as "The Guild," which continues to be held every April. It was initially conceived of as a daylong set of musical competitions, coinciding with the annual exhibition of the Isle of Man Fine Arts and Industrial Guild. She also arranged the songs contained within Arthur William Moore's 1896 book Manx Ballads and Music, for which he was reliant on Wood and other individuals. She herself wrote articles on Manx music for such publications as Ellan Vannin magazine.

In 1908, she was presented with a gift of 200 guineas in appreciation for her work to advance music and music education on the Isle of Man. She died in 1925, at age 85.
