= Peveril of the Peak, Manchester =

Listed pub in England

Peveril of the Peak
- The pub in 2009, looking north-east across Great Bridgewater Street
- Alternative names: The Pev

General information
- Type: Public house
- Location: 127 Great Bridgewater Street, Manchester, England
- Coordinates: 53.4753°N 2.2416°W
- Year built: c. 1820; 206 years ago
- Renovated: c. 1900 (remodelled)

Design and construction
- Designations

Listed Building – Grade II
- Official name: Peveril of the Peak public house
- Designated: 19 June 1988
- Reference no.: 1293058

Other information
- Public transit: Manchester Oxford Road

The Peveril of the Peak is a Grade II listed public house on Great Bridgewater Street in Manchester, England. Dating from around 1820 and remodelled in about 1900, it is known for its green‑tiled exterior and surviving Victorian interior features. The origin of its name is disputed, with suggestions linking it either to Sir Walter Scott's 1823 novel of the same name or to a stagecoach that once ran between Manchester and London and was itself named after the novel. The Campaign for Real Ale (CAMRA) considers its interior to be of "outstanding national historic importance".

== History ==
The public house was built around 1820 and underwent internal and external remodelling around 1900. It has a green-tiled exterior with polished wood, stained glass windows, and bench seating inside.

The source of its name is disputed, with some saying it references the 1823 novel of the same name by Sir Walter Scott, and others that it is in commemoration of a horse-drawn stagecoach that travelled between Manchester and London in only two days and was also named after the novel.

The pub was reportedly used as a brothel by G.I.s during the Second World War.

On 19 June 1988, the Peveril of the Peak was Grade II listed. It is regarded by the Campaign for Real Ale (CAMRA) as having an interior of "outstanding national historic importance" and is rated three stars on its National Inventory of Historic Pub Interiors.

The pub stands on a roughly triangular tract of land between Chepstow Street and Great Bridgewater Street, with the rest of the original terrace demolished, surrounded by taller office and apartment blocks from the 19th and 21st centuries. In July 2026, the Peveril of the Peak was named Britain's best pub by Time Out magazine.

== Architecture ==
=== Exterior ===
The building is faced in brick and covered with coloured ceramic tiles, with a Welsh slate roof and chimneys along the ridge. It sits on a corner plot and has an irregular V‑shaped layout, with the bar and serving area positioned at the point of the angle. Inside, an S‑shaped passage leads to two rooms at the rear.

The Chepstow Street façade in 2008

From the outside it appears as two low storeys beneath a shallow hipped roof. The west side is narrow, with one doorway and one window, while the north and south sides are longer. The ground floor is finished with dark green tiles at the base and yellow‑green tiles above, some smooth and some patterned; the upper floor is clad in plain yellow tiles. There is a centrally placed entrance on both the north and south elevations. Each doorway is framed by brightly coloured tiled pilasters. A tiled band between the floors carries raised lettering: the pub's name on the north and south sides, and "Wines & Spirits" on the west.

Ground‑floor windows have surrounds made of dark green tiles, and the upper‑floor windows have similar detailing in brown. On the south side, near the west end, the upper floor includes a blocked window. A painted hanging sign is fixed to a decorative wrought‑iron bracket at the right‑hand end.

=== Interior ===
Internally, the corridor is lined with a waist‑high band of green and cream tiles, some smooth and others patterned. On the west side, a timber and glass partition forms the back of the serving area; the upper panels contain stained glass with flowing Art Nouveau‑style designs. Serving hatches open onto the corridor. The small entrance lobbies on each side use similar wood and glass detailing.

The bar counter has panelled fronts and pilasters, and although the structure above it was added in the late 20th century, it follows the style of the original fittings behind the bar. All the public rooms contain fixed seating, and the rooms to the east include bell pushes. The south‑east room has both bell pushes and an ornate fireplace.

== See also ==
- Listed buildings in Manchester-M1
- Listed pubs in Greater Manchester
