= George Waldron =

Isle of Man poet

George Waldron (1690 – c. 1730) was an English poet and topographer known particularly for work on the Isle of Man. Sir Walter Scott made use of his topography in Peveril of the Peak.

== Life ==
Waldron, born in 1690, was son of Francis Waldron of London, descended from an Essex family. He seems to have received early education at Felsted School and on 7 May 1706 matriculated at The Queen's College, Oxford. He resided in the Isle of Man, acting as commissioner from the British government watching the excise on the island's trade. He died in England before 1731, having just obtained a new commission from the British government.

== Works ==
Soon after Waldron's death, his Compleat Works in Verse and Prose were "printed for the widow and orphans" in London, 1731. The dedication to William O'Brien, 4th Earl of Inchiquin, is signed by Theodosia Waldron. The first part contains "Miscellany Poems" and the second "Tracts, Political and Historical", including Waldron's main work, "A Description of the Isle of Man". This, written in 1726, was twice reprinted in London, then edited with an introductory notice and notes by William Harrison for the Manx Society (vol. xi. Douglas, 1865). Sir Walter Scott in Peveril of the Peak made strong use of this work of Waldron's. Later writers on the Isle of Man gave his legends prominence.

Among his other works are:

- A Perswasive Oration to the People of Great Britain to stand up in defence of their Religion and Liberty, London, 1716
- A Speech made to the Loyal Society, at the Mug-House in Long-Acre; June the 7th, 1716. Being the Day for the Public Thanksgiving, for putting an end to that most unnatural Rebellion, London, 1716
- A Poem, humbly inscrib'd to ... George, Prince of Wales, London, 1717
- The Regency and Return, a Poem humbly inscribed to ... Lord Newport, son and heir to ... Richard, Earl of Bradford [London, c. 1717]
- An Ode on the 28th of May, being the Anniversary of his Majesty's happy Nativity [London], 1723
