= Emma Christian =

British singer

Emma Christian (born 1972) is a prominent artist in the recent revival of traditional Manx folk music.

== Early life ==
Christian grew up at Ballakeigh in the parish of Bride and is the daughter of William Christian, who served as Captain of the Parish from 1981 to 2025. In 1990, she went to Cambridge University in England to study Celtic history.

== Career ==
Christian's music career was launched in 1994 at the Edinburgh Festival in Scotland. Emma sings in both Manx and English and accompanies herself on the harp, but also plays the recorder.

She has made several acclaimed performances at the annual Festival Interceltique de Lorient in Brittany and other Celtic festivals throughout the world

Emma's first album was Beneath the Twilight or Ta'n Dooid Cheet in Manx (Manx Celtic Productions, 1994) and has also appeared on compilation albums such as Celtic Voices (Narada, 1995), Celtic Airs & Ballads (Beautiful Jo, 1996), Celtic Songs of Love (Beautiful Jo, 1997), Festival Interceltique de Lorient: Volume 2 (Eromi 1997) and Celtic Dreams (Ellipsis Arts 2003)
