= Mrs. Macfarlane =

Mrs MacFarlane (fl. 1716–1719) is known for being outlawed for the murder of John Cayley. The story of how she avoided punishment was the basis of verse and it was part of the story in Sir Walter Scott's novel Peveril of the Peak.

== Life ==
MacFarlane was born to Colonel Charles Straiton at the end of the 17th century. She married John MacFarlane who was many years her senior when she was 19. She came to notice following the death of John Cayley on 2 October 1716. He had been wounded and then killed by two shots from his own pistols. These pistols had been lent to John MacFarlane. It was said that the motive for the murder was self-defence as Macfarlane feared that she was to be sexually assaulted. This account was given to her servant, Barbara Martine, when she returned to the house. When her husband returned she told him what had happened and that she had been attacked by Cayley after being tricked to his lodgings three days before. Her husband found the body and he advised his wife not to face trial but to flee. Other sources indicate that MacFarlane had changed her underwear before Cayley arrived. Cayley was a commissioner for the customs and he was known to the family.

MacFarlane followed her husband's advice and she was "outlawed". Verses were written that supported MacFarlane for killing in self defence.

According to some sources, she lived on in Edinburgh, being kept in a hidden room by the Swinton family. Sir Walter Scott says that he was told this story by his aunt Margaret Swinton, who said that she had met Mrs MacFarlane in her parlour and she had disappeared into a secret apartment. Her aunt's family had sworn her to secrecy as they said that MacFarlane's life was at stake.

Her husband remarried in 1719, and this is presumed to be after her death.
