= Manx Society for the Publication of National Documents =

The Manx Society for the Publication of National Documents, or simply the Manx Society, was a text publication society founded in February 1858 with the objective of publishing reprints of historical documents relating to the Isle of Man, its people, and culture. Over its lifetime the society published 33 volumes of documents, the last appearing in 1893. Its publications included an English-Manx dictionary based on the surviving manuscript of John Kelly, books on the laws and currency of the island, reprints of accounts of visits to the island, the Book of Common Prayer in Manx, and a translation of the Chronicles of Mann.

== See also ==
- William Harrison (antiquary)
