= William Harrison (antiquary) =

English antiquarian (1802–1884)

William Harrison (1802–1884) was an English antiquary. He helped establish the Manx Society in 1858; and wrote for that society a number of antiquarian works relating to the Isle of Man, beginning with Bibliotheca Monensis in 1861.

== Life ==
William Harrison, son of Isaac Harrison, hat manufacturer and merchant, was born at Salford, Lancashire, on 11 December 1802. Early in life he sought his fortune at the Cape of Good Hope. Returning to England he settled down about 1845 on a small estate of his own in the Isle of Man, where he became a member of the House of Keys, and afterwards a justice of the peace. Through his exertions the Manx Society was formed in 1858 for the publication of documents relating to the Isle of Man. He married Mary Sefton Beck in 1832, and died at Rockmount, near Peel, Isle of Man, on 22 November 1884.

== Works ==
He contributed fourteen volumes to the works of the Manx Society, including:

- The Bibliotheca Monensis, a Bibliographical Account of Works relating to the Isle of Man, 1861, 2nd edition 1876;
- Manx Proverbs and Sayings, Ballads, &c. 1868;
- Account of the Diocese of Sodor and Man, 1879;
- Manx Miscellanies, 1880.

He was an occasional writer on antiquarian matters in the Manchester Guardian and other papers.

== Sources ==
- Harrison, A. M. (2004). "Harrison, William (1802–1884), antiquary". Oxford Dictionary of National Biography (online ed.). Oxford University Press. doi:10.1093/ref:odnb/12458. (Subscription, Wikipedia Library access or UK public library membership required.)

Attribution:

- This article incorporates text from a publication now in the public domain: Sutton, Charles William (1891). "Harrison, William (1802-1884)". In Stephen, Leslie; Lee, Sidney (eds.). Dictionary of National Biography. Vol. 25. London: Smith, Elder & Co. pp. 49–50.
