= King Chiaullee =

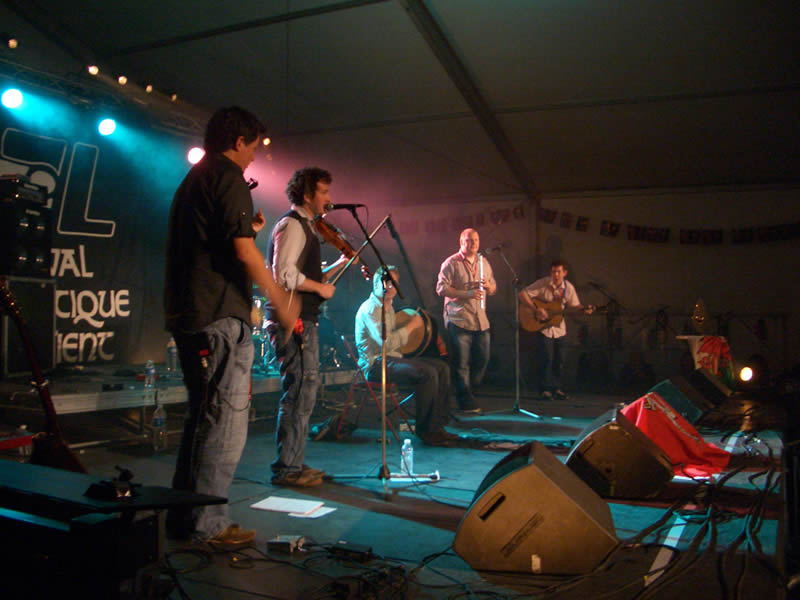
King Chiaullee on stage in Lorient, 2008

King Chiaullee are a Celtic music band from the Isle of Man. The band met while at school together in 1994, and have since performed at numerous festivals throughout the UK, Europe, and in the United States.

The group has five members:

- Adam Rhodes (fiddle and bouzouki)
- David Kilgallon (fiddle)
- Russell Cowin (bodhran and double bass)
- Gilno Carswell (whistle)
- Matthew Kelly (guitar and mandolin)

King Chiaullee combines Manx, Scottish and Irish traditional music alongside original material written by the band, creating a distinctive fusion of traditional and contemporary Celtic music.

The band have produced three studio albums, Baase Cooil Stroo (2000), Reel:Ode (2003) and Nish! (2006), and have also contributed to numerous compilation albums.

In 2008 the group performed at Festival Interceltique de Lorient in Brittany and, competing in the festival's band competition, went on to win first prize - the Trophée Cidrerie des Terroirs. This led to performances in Milan and at Italy's renowned Celtica festival.
