= Mananan festival =

The annual Mananan International Festivals are cultural events held on the Isle of Man. There are several events throughout the year including the Mananan International Festival, the Opera Festival, the Oboe Festival and the Viola Festival. Events are held mainly in the Erin Arts Centre, Port Erin on the Isle of Man.

== History ==
The Mananan festival was founded by John Bethell in 1975 and is supported by the Isle of Man Arts Council. John Bethell has directed the festival from its beginning. Patrons have included Sir John Betjeman, the Earl of Harewood, and Lady Barbirolli. The present patron is the pianist, Stephen Hough.
