= Glashtyn =

Legendary creature from Manx folklore

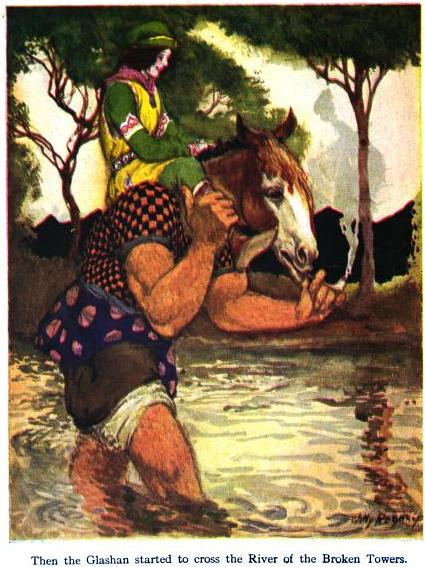
A glashan featured in an Irish folktale retelling. —Illust. Willy Pogany. Colum, Padraic (1916). King of Ireland's son

Glashtyn (Manx English: glashtin, glashtan [ˈɡlaʃθən] or glashan; Manx: glashtin or glashtyn [ˈɡlaʃtʲənʲ]) is a legendary creature from Manx folklore.

The glashtin is said to be a goblin that appears out of its aquatic habitat, to come in contact with the island folk; others claim it takes the shape of a colt, or equate it to the water horse known locally as cabbyl-ushtey. Yet another source claims the glashtin was a water-bull (tarroo-ushtey in Manx), half-bovine and half-equine.

Some tales or lore recount that it has pursued after women, ending in the stock motif of escape by cutting loose the skirt-hem, although in one modern version her escape is achieved by a rooster's crowing; in that tale the glashtin pretends to be a handsome man but is betrayed by his horse-ears.

== Lexicography ==
The word glashtin is thought to derive from Celtic glais (Old Irish: glais, glaise, glas), meaning "stream", or sometimes even the sea.

=== Celtic Manx language ===
"Glashtin" is the orthography in the Manx language according to Cregeen's dictionary (1835), and this is the spelling adhered to by Joseph Train, A. W. Moore and various other 19th century authorities of Manx folklore.

However the spelling "Glashtyn" is used as heading in John Kelly's Fockleyr dictionary of 1866.

Manx Gaelic glashtin, glashtyn is pronounced /ɡlaʃtʲənʲ/ according to a recent paper on the language. (Note: Phoneticized as /Glosh-teen/ by one non-scholarly (apparently Wiccan) source.)

=== Manx English ===
In the Manx English dialect, "Glashan, glashtan, glashtin" as 'hairy goblin' is the primary (and most detailed) entry given in Moore's posthumous dictionary (1924), completed in collaboration with Morrison and Goodwin.

Glashtan, glashtin ([glaʃən]) and glashan ([glaʃþən]) are the phonology given in Moore's dictionary. (Note: The /þ/ being explained as the sound "th" as in "thin" (on p. xi), it apparently signifies the /θ/ sound.) (Note: Alternatively pronounced /ˈɡlæʃtɪn/.)

The form "glashan" is found in folklore examples collect on a southerly island (Calf of Man) by J. F. Campbell. (Note: J. F. Campbell orally collected examples which were at least partly in Manx Gaelic ("Manks" as he calls it), but he confesses to not being able to make out various parts of it. As such, he does not provide a transcript of Manx Gaelic, and only gives English summaries in his introduction to the book. Hence the "glashan" here is presumably Manx English or transliteration into English.)

== Definitions ==
The Celtic Manx term glashtin is a masculine noun denoting "a goblin, a sprite" according to Cregeen's dictionary, while Moore's Manx English dictionary gives "hairy goblin", which can also be applied figuratively to a "big, hulking boy". Kelly adds that the goblin emerges out of water.

But according to Manx writer Joseph Train, "the glashtin is a water-horse that formerly, like the §taroo-ushtey, left his native element to associate with land animals of the same class".

This dual picture prompted A. W. Moore to comment that the glashan or glashtin is sometimes ascribed a hairy goblin's attributes, like the fenodyree's, and sometimes horse-like attributes, like the cabbyl-ushtey's. Welsh scholar Rhys also concurred, saying that his "informants" were at odds, some of them regarding the "glastyn" as the Manx version of the brownie, while others were adamant it was "a sort of grey colt, frequenting the banks of lakes at night". (Note: Briggs subscribes to the notion that the "almost extinct glashan" is confused with the glashtin, and the glashan is the spirit that is "sometimes described as a kind of fenoderee".)

=== Shapeshifter theory ===
The two conflicting accounts above can be reconciled by regarding the Manx glashtin as a shape-shifter. Recent literature embracing this notion claims that the equine glashtin assumes human form at times, but betrays his identity when he fails to conceal his ears, which are pointed like a horse's.

One modern fairy tale relates how a fisherman's daughter living in Scarlett outwitted the foreign-tongued "dark and handsome" stranger whom she recognized as glashtin by his horse's ears. She knew she was in peril because according to lore, the glashtin had the ill habit of transforming into a "water-horse" and dragging women to sea. (Note: Broome, Dora (1951). "The Glashtin". Fairy Tales from the Isle of Man. Harmondsworth: Penguin. pp. 48–53. Also cited by Briggs.)

== Reversed hooves ==
Although the glashtin may assume a normal horse's guise, it had hooves which "were back to front", writes Wiltshire native folklore author Ralph Whitlock, writing in 1979. The reversed hooves has been ascribed to the Shetlandic njogel by James A. Teit back in 1918.

== Folklore attestations ==
An early commentary on the glashtin occurs in Joseph Train's History (1845). (Note: Train claimed he used as his source an MS Account of Manks Superstition, which was a study on folklore he commissioned specifically for his work from an island native.)

According to Train, the glashtin is a sort of a water-horse, while at the same time, the fairy fiddler Hom Mooar was a glashtin as well, thus providing a dichotomous picture of the legendary creature.

=== Water horse ===
In one passage, Train claims the glashtin to be a water-horse, and that this sea-glashtin would at one time emerge from his marine habitat, mingling with the local land-roving ponies, and cross breed to produce foal.

Train drew similarity to the Manx water-bull (see taroo ushtey below) which also shared the trait of mingling with land livestock. In fact the water-bull attempts to mate with domesticated cows as well, only unsuccessfully, according to George Waldron (1731). (Note: The water bull's crossbred progeny always turning out to be non-viable "lumps of flesh", as Dalyell has noted in 1835, citing Waldron.) (Note: Waldron wrote of the water-bull but did not mention the glashtin.)

The glashtin, it was said, ceased to appear after the islanders started cross-breeding their native horses with breeds from the outside.

=== Seducer of women ===
German mythographer Karl Blind noted that Manx glashtin or elashtan "attacks lonely women" as is the case with the Shetlandic nuggle and the Scottish kelpie.

The creature was known to have great curiosity for women and pester them in rather picaresque manner, and would grab hold and tear off pieces of women's attire.

==== Cutting the grabbed hem off dress motif ====
One anecdote concerns a glashan who caught a girl by getting a tight grip-hold of her dress. But while he slept, she cut away the dress and escaped, making him cast away the cloth, uttering something in Manx unintelligible to Campbell. Charles Roeder records a similar tale of a woman who loosened her apron-string to rid herself of the glashtin clung on her apron, and he spoke these words: 'Rumbyl, rumbyl, cha vel ayms agh yn sampyl' (The edge or skirt of the garment, I have but the sample). (Note: Manx rumbyl is glossed as 'skirt, border', but seems to also mean (a horse's) posterior, 'rump, croup'.) Sophia Morrison gives another version with this tale motif, entitled "The Buggane of the Glen Meay Waterfall".

==== Rooster's crowing ====
In the aforementioned modern fairy tale, on a stormy night in Scarlett, the girl Kirree Quayle gave refuge to a dark, handsome stranger, but afterwards recognized him be a glashtin, deducing from his horse ears. She feared for herself knowing the creature was reputed to shape-shift into a water-horse and drag women to sea. As her fisherman father was late, she wished for dawn's break which would banish any non-mortals. She resisted his temptation of a strand of pearls dangled before her, and when grabbed she let out a scream, causing the red cockerel to crow, prematurely announcing the break of dawn, scaring the glashtin away.

=== Fairy fiddler ===
Train also alleged that the renowned Hom Mooar (which signifies "Big Tom", a name of a fairy fiddler), was a glashtin. He goes on to supply as an example a tale taken from Waldron, describing a man was lured by invisible musicians to a strange banquet, and obtained the silver cup that came to be used for the "consecrated Wine in Kirk-Merlugh (Malew Church), even though Waldron never refers to the enchanted musicians as glashtin or "Big Tom".

=== Helpful spirit ===
Manx lore concerning a helpful glashan was collected by Scottish folklorist J. F. Campbell, from a woman living on the Calf of Man in the southern part of the Isle of Man. The story-telling woman described a creature or being which assisted her as farmhand, performing the tasks of rounding up sheep from the fold, or threshing stalks of corn left unbundled. (Note: Cf. A similar account by Charles Roeder regarding the Glashtin, which Rhys (1901) ascertains is "about the fenodyree under the name of glashtyn".)

== Similar or conflated mythical creatures ==
=== Tarroo-ushtey ===
tarroo-ushtey (Manx pronunciation: [ˌtaru ˈuʃtʲə], Manx English pronunciation:[ˈtaru ˈùʃtþə], Mx. for "water bull")

The 18th century Manx local historian George Waldron records the superstition about the Water-Bull, an "amphibious creature" with every semblance of a natural bull, but a cow mating with it calves only a misshapen "lump of flesh and skin without bones" and often dies giving birth. Waldron also wrote that a neighbor detected a stray bull in his herd and, suspecting it to be a Water-Bull, rounded up a group of men with pitchforks to give it chase. The beast, however, dived into a river and eluded them, bobbing its head up in mockery. It was Train who later supplied the equivalent name in the Manx language, and made similarity comparisons to the glashtin.

John Nelson (1840-1910), a Manx informant well-versed in local Gaelic lore, argued that the water-bull was "supposed to be a goblin half cow and half horse" and so it and the glashtin were one and the same.

=== Cabbyl-ushtey ===
cabbyl-ushtey (Note: Also known as Cabbyl-ny-hoie 'the night-horse'.) (Manx pronunciation: [ˈkaːvəl ˈuʃtʲə], [ˈkabəlˈuʃtʲə], Manx English pronunciation:[ˈkāvəl ˈùʃtþə], Mx. for "water horse")

Manx folklorist and historian Arthur William Moore was unable to avoid the dichotomy regarding the glashtin. In one instance, Moore represents the glashtin as "a hairy goblin or sprite", but also says glashtin was another name for a water-horse or the cabbyl-ushtey. (Note: Train only referred to the "water horse" in English, and later Moor applied the Manx name.)

Moore says there was a sighting of the horse in 1859 at Ballure Glen, and after being spotted people from nearby Ramsey flocked to see, but no one caught sight of it. The glen beneath the Glen Meay Waterfall (near Peel; see Morrison's tale above) was haunted by the ghost of a man who unwittingly rode on the horseback of the glashtin or cabbyl-ushtey, and was drowned at sea. (Note: Moore (1891), p. 54; Identification with glashtin given at also given by Moore (1896), p. xxii.) (Note: Moore took both these stories Jenkinson's book published in 1874, whose source for the first sighting was a "respectable farmer's wife from Ramsey" who told Jenkinson about an occurrence reaching 15 years back.)

One tale recounts how a cabbyl-ushtey emerged from the Awin Dhoo (Black River) and devoured a farmer's cow, then later it took his teenaged daughter. Nevertheless, recent literature makes the cabbyl-ushtey as being more benign than the Scottish Gaelic each-uisge.

== See also ==
- Glaistig
- Kelpie
- Each uisce
- Water bull
- Ceffyl Dŵr
- Fenodyree
- Buggane
- Neck (nykken)
