= Music of the Isle of Man =

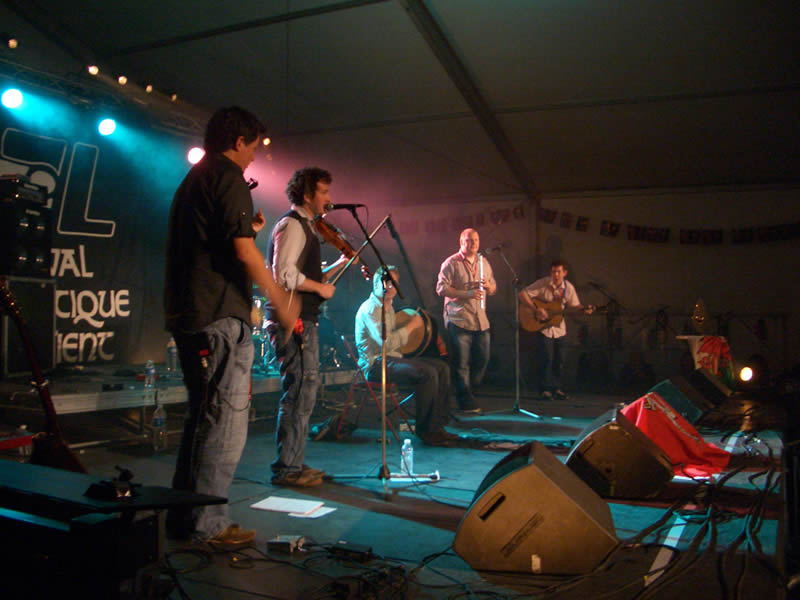
King Chiaullee in Lorient, 2008

The music of the Isle of Man reflects Celtic, Norse and other influences, including those from its neighbours, Scotland, Ireland, England and Wales. The Isle of Man is a small island nation in the Irish Sea, between Great Britain and Ireland (and not part of the United Kingdom).

A wide range of music is performed on the island, such as rock, blues, jazz and pop. However, its traditional folk music has undergone a revival since the 1970s, starting with a music festival called Yn Chruinnaght in Ramsey. This was part of a general revival of the Manx language and culture, after the death of the last native speaker of Manx in 1974.

Musicians of the Manx musical revival include King Chiaullee, Skeeal, The Mannin Folk, Mactullagh Vannin, Moot and many others. Culture Vannin provides a central resource for Manx music and dance through the manxmusic.com website, which has links to most performers. Other artists who have produced CDs include Emma Christian (Ta'n Dooid Cheet – Beneath the Twilight), (voice, harp and recorder), and harpist and producer Charles Guard (Avenging and Bright), formerly an administrator at Culture Vannin. Many of the web entries about Manx music stem from Cliff McGann's 1996 article which is now somewhat out of date.

== Early history ==
Little can be determined about the character of music on the Isle of Man prior to the 15th century. There are many carved crosses from this era, but they depict a total of two musicians, one lur player and a harpist. Songs from this era may have had Scandinavian origins; some also bear similarities to Irish and Scottish music. The song Reeaghyn dy Vannin (the Manx sword dance) is very similar to a lullaby from the Hebrides and is also said to have been a ritual dance during the Scandinavian era.

The earliest written evidence describes fiddle music and a variety of folk dances. There was no harp tradition as was otherwise prevalent in Celtic music. English folk songs were very popular, later including broadside ballads, jigs and reels. Also extant were traditional Gaelic psalm-singing and other church music.

According to Fenella Bazin, "...[E]vidence from written sources shows that the Manx were enthusiastic dancers and musicians, often appearing in the ecclesiastical courts on charges on making music on Saturday nights or after church on Sundays." A traditional Manx melody is Mylecharane (The Manx National Air).

=== Carvals ===
In 1891, Manx antiquarian and folklorist Arthur William Moore published a collection of Manx Carols. The carval is related to the medieval English carol and sung to popular Manx tunes. These carols were formerly sung in the parish churches on Christmas Eve, or Oie'l Verrey (a corruption of Oie Feaill Voirrey (the eve of Mary's Feast, i.e. Christmas Eve), as it was called. It was the custom for the people on this night to bring their own candles, so that the church was brilliantly illuminated. Decorations mainly consisted of branches of holly and festoons of ivy. After the prayers were read and a hymn sung, the parson usually went home, leaving the clerk in charge. Then each one who had a carol to sing would do so in turn, so that the proceedings were continued till a very late hour, and sometimes also became of a rather riotous character, as it was a custom for the female part of the congregation to provide themselves with peas, which they flung at their bachelor friends. On the way home a considerable proportion of the congregation would probably visit the nearest inn, where they would partake of the traditional drink on such occasions, viz. hot ale, flavoured with spice, ginger, and pepper. It was traditional to sing Arrane Oie Vie (Good-night Song) on the way home.

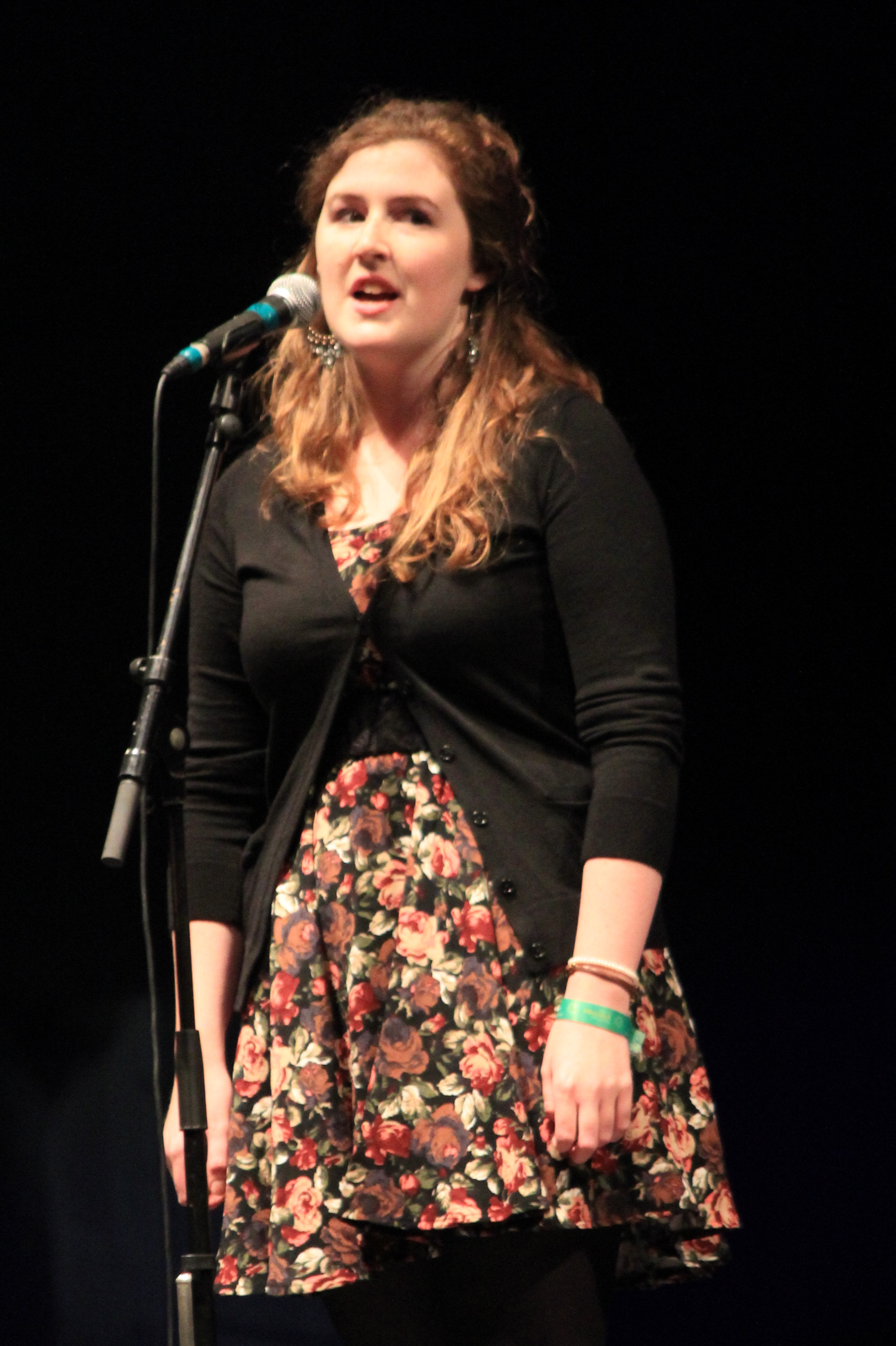
Ruth Keggin, singer-songwriter and activist.

=== Ballads ===
The ballad Ushtey Millish 'sy Garee relates to the old practice of summoning a jury of 24 men to decide questions connected with water-courses, boundaries, etc. and is dated to sometime prior to 1777. A bardoon was a locally composed song about the loss of a loved one at sea. Yn Chenn Dolphin (The Old Dolphin) is a tale about a shipwreck.

== 19th century ==
Church music is the most documented Manx music of the 19th century. Lining out was a common technique, as it was throughout Great Britain and Ireland. West gallery musicians performed for special occasions, using locally composed or well-known compositions. Organs were a later importation that became standard in most of the island's churches. The first mention of an organ on the island is associated with St George's church, Douglas in September 1781. The first collection of Manx church songs was printed in 1799, and was followed by many other collections, though it was not until the 1870s and 1880s that Manx music began to be published in any great quantity, as drawing-room ballads, religious songs, and choral arrangements all became popular. The proliferation of this music coincided with a boom in the tourism industry for the island, and Manx music-hall and dance-hall songs and dances saw increased demand. Manx language songs, in particular, benefited from the Gaelic revival from the 19th century onwards.

== 20th century ==
A notable musical episode in the Isle of Man was the imprisonment between 1940 and 1941 of many German musicians of Jewish extraction in Hutchinson Internment Camp on the island. These included Hans Gál (who composed there works for performance by the camp orchestra), Egon Wellesz, and Marjan Rawicz.

Though West Gallery music continued into the 1950s, by the 20th century instrumental music accompanied most worship on the Isle of Man. Later in the 20th century, Manx church musical traditions slowly declined. The legacy of immigration, from England and elsewhere, has brought in many new styles of music to the island.

Some of the last native Manx speakers, including Ned Maddrell, were recording singing traditional songs. In 1909, the Austrian ethnologist Rudolf Trebitsch made several recordings, as did the Irish Folklore Commission in 1948.

== Future ==
Culture Vannin has a dedicated Manx Music Development Team comprising a Manx music specialist, who works with the island's Department of Education, Sport and Culture to encourage the development of Manx music in the school curriculum, and a Manx Music Development Officer, who works to promote Manx music and dance in the wider community. CDs by bands, soloists and Gaelic choirs are produced.

== Manx Music Festival ==
The Manx Music Festival is an annual music festival held at the end of each April in Douglas. It was founded in 1892 by the "Mother of Manx Music" M. L. Wood after music classes were included in the Fine Arts and Industrial Guild, after which the festival gets its colloquial name of "The Guild". Local people and visitors are invited to take part in various singing, instrumental, drama and public speaking classes. At the close of the festival, winners of the individual voice categories compete to win the Cleveland Medal, first donated in 1923 by the Cleveland Manx Society. The first performance of the Manx National Anthem occurred at The Guild in 1907, accompanied by Harry Wood's Orchestra.

== Special projects ==
In November 2014 Culture Vannin, a government sponsored entity, brought together musicians from Norway and the Isle of Man to produce the Norwegian-Manx Collaboration featuring traditional music and providing an educational tour around the Isle of Man. The collaboration featured Manx musicians Tom Callister, Ruth Keggin and David Kilgallon, as well as Norwegian musicians Erlend Apneseth and Margit Myhr.
