= Joseph Train =

Scottish officer

Joseph Train (6 November 1779 – 7 December 1852) was a Scottish excise officer, antiquarian, writer and poet. He corresponded with Sir Walter Scott, and his local knowledge provided Scott with ideas for his novels.

== Life ==
Train was born in 1779 at Gilmilnscroft in the parish of Sorn, Ayrshire, where his father was grieve and land-steward, in 1787 moving to the Townhead of Ayr, and becoming a day labourer. The boy, apprenticed to a weaver in Ayr, was interested in learning, particularly antiquarian and traditional lore. From 1799 he served in the Ayrshire militia, until the regiment was disbanded at the peace of Amiens in 1802.

While the regiment was stationed at Inverness he became a subscriber to Currie's edition of The Works of Robert Burns, published in 1800. This proved a turning point to his fortunes. The colonel of the regiment, Sir David Hunter-Blair, having seen the volumes in the bookseller's shop previous to their delivery, wished to purchase them, and, on being told that they had already been subscribed for by one of his own men, was so much pleased that he gave orders to have them handsomely rebound and sent to Train free of charge. Some time after the regiment was disbanded, he obtained for Train an agency for a manufacturing house in Glasgow, and in 1806–7 an appointment as supernumerary excise officer in the Ayr district.

=== Excise officer ===
In 1806 Train published his first set of poems, Poetical Reveries, dedicated to Hunter-Blair. In 1810 he was sent to Balnaguard in the Aberfeldy district, to aid in the suppression of smuggling in Breadalbane. But besides his official interest in the suppression of the traffic, he regarded the welfare of those engaged in it; and, convinced that the excessive resort to the practice in the Highlands was in part due to erroneous legislation, he prepared a "Paper on Smuggling", in which he argued against what was called the "Highland Line" and the refusal to license stills of a capacity less than five hundred gallons. His suggestions, having through Sir Walter Scott been placed before the board of excise in 1815, were finally adopted.

=== Sir Walter Scott ===
In 1811 Train was appointed to the Largs side in the Ayr district, and while there and at Newton Stewart in New Galloway, to which he was transferred in 1813, he had special opportunity for the collection of south-western tales and traditions. Several of these he wove into ballad narratives, which he published in 1814 under the title of Strains of the Mountain Muse. While the work was passing through Ballantyne's press it attracted the attention of Sir Walter Scott, who was especially interested in the "notes illustrative of traditions in Galloway and Ayrshire", and immediately wrote to Train asking to be included in the list of subscribers for eleven copies. After perusing the volume on its publication he also expressed to Train his appreciation of it, and more especially of the notes on old traditions; and requested him to communicate to him any "matters of that order" which he did not himself think of using. Train had already, with Captain James Denniston, begun to collect materials for a "History of Galloway", but from this time "he renounced every idea of authorship for himself", and resolved that "henceforth his chief pursuit should be collecting whatever he thought would be interesting" to Scott. Scott's obligations to him, which were very great, are acknowledged in different prefaces and notes.

When Train first corresponded with Scott, Scott was at work on The Lord of the Isles and at his request Train sent him a description of Turnberry Castle, and at the same time communicated the tradition of the "wondrous light", which was introduced by Scott in the fifth canto of the poem. In the interest of Scott, Train states that he became "still more zealous in the pursuit of ancient lore", and that his love of old traditions became so notorious that "even beggars, in the hope of reward, came from afar to Newton Stewart to recite old ballads and relate old stories" to him. Much of the material could only be partially utilised by Scott, but there was an invaluable residuum. The romance of Redgauntlet had its germ in certain notes to Train's volume of poems. Guy Mannering owed its birth to a legendary ballad which he supplied. The outline of Wandering Willie's Tale was derived from one of his traditionary stories, and he furnished Scott with the prototype of Wandering Willie himself.

=== Sources of Scott's works ===
To him, according to John Gibson Lockhart, we owe "the whole machinery of the Tales of My Landlord as well as the adoption of the Claverhouse period for the scene of one of his fictions [Old Mortality]". Old Mortality himself was mainly his discovery; but for him The Antiquary would have been ungraced by the quaint figure of Edie Ochiltree, and the bizarre apparition of Madge Wildfire would have been wanting from The Heart of Midlothian had he not told Scott the story of Feckless Fanny. The Doom of Devorgoil was suggested by his tale of Plunton, and he supplied the story on which Scott founded his last novel, The Surgeon's Daughter. All this is in addition to much and various antiquarian matter, which enriched in many ways the texture of Scott's romances. Train also sent to Scott numerous antique curiosities, including the spleuchan of Rob Roy MacGregor, which Lockhart thought probably led Scott to adopt the adventures of Rob Roy as one of his themes. He secured for Scott the Torrs Pony-cap and Horns, important objects of the Iron Age, now in the National Museum of Scotland.

=== History and prehistory of Scotland ===
Train supplied to George Chalmers, author of Caledonia, the earliest knowledge of Roman remains in Ayrshire and Wigtownshire, it being previously supposed that the Romans had never penetrated into Wigtownshire, nor further into Ayrshire than Loudoun Hill. This included notices of the Roman post on the Blackwater of Dee, of the Roman camp at Rispain near Galloway, and of the Roman road from Dumfriesshire to Ayr. Train further succeeded in tracing the wall, of very ancient but unknown origin, called the Deil's Dyke, from Loch Ryan in Wigtownshire to the farm of Hightae in the parish of Lochmaben, Dumfriesshire, a distance of eighty miles.

While Agnes Strickland was collecting material for her life of Mary, Queen of Scots, she applied to Train for information regarding the flight of Mary through eastern Galloway after the battle of Langside, but any lingering traditions of this occurrence must be regarded as compounded more largely of fiction than of fact.

=== Later career ===
In 1820, through the representations of Scott to the lord advocate, Train was promoted to supervisor, the station to which he was appointed being Cupar, Fife, whence in 1822 he was transferred to Queensferry, and in 1823 to Falkirk. Owing, however, to the then prevailing custom of reserving the highest offices of the excise mainly for Englishmen, the efforts of Scott for the advancement of Train to the rank of general supervisor or collector were unsuccessful. Not only so, but owing to fictitious offences, manufactured it is said by an English official, Train was in 1824 "removed in censure" from Falkirk to be supervisor at Wigtown, and although afterwards he was appointed to Dumfries, he was, on account of a supposed negligence, reduced while at Dumfries from the rank of supervisor. After six months he was, however, on his own petition, restored to his former rank, being appointed in November 1827 supervisor at Castle Douglas. While there he supplied Scott with a variety of information for his notes to the new edition of the Waverley Novels begun in 1829. In November of the same year he was admitted a member of the Society of Antiquaries of Scotland.

=== Last years ===
The death of Scott in 1832 made a great blank in the life of Train, but the absence of the accustomed stimulus did not lessen his interest in his old studies. Although he had presented Scott with many antiquarian relics, he still retained a rare and valuable collection of his own. James Hannay, editor of the Edinburgh Courant who records in Household Words of 10 July 1853 a visit which he paid to Train, states that his "little parlour was full of antiquities", and describes him as "a tall old man, with an autumnal red in his face, hale-looking, and of simple quaint manners". After his retirement from the excise in 1836, he took up his residence in a cottage near Castle Douglas, where he occupied his leisure in contributing to Chambers's Journal and other periodicals, in completing his Historical and Statistical Account of the Isle of Man, from the earliest time to the present date, with a view of its peculiar customs and popular superstitions (1845), and in writing an account of the local religious sect known as the Buchanites, under the title The Buchanites from First to Last (1846). His last work, The Wild Scot of Galloway: a Poem, was published in 1848. He died on 7 December 1852. He had married in 1803 Mary, daughter of Robert Wilson, a gardener in Ayr, and they had five children.

A monument to Train was unveiled in 1909 in the McMillan Hall, Newton Stewart.
