= Glen Maye =

Coordinates: 54.184°N 4.704°W

Glen Maye: Manx: Glion Maye
- Location within the Isle of Man
- OS grid reference: SC236799
- Parish: Patrick
- Sheading: Glenfaba
- Crown dependency: Isle of Man
- Post town: ISLE OF MAN
- Postcode district: IM5
- Dialling code: 01624
- Police: Isle of Man
- Fire: Isle of Man
- Ambulance: Isle of Man
- House of Keys: Glenfaba

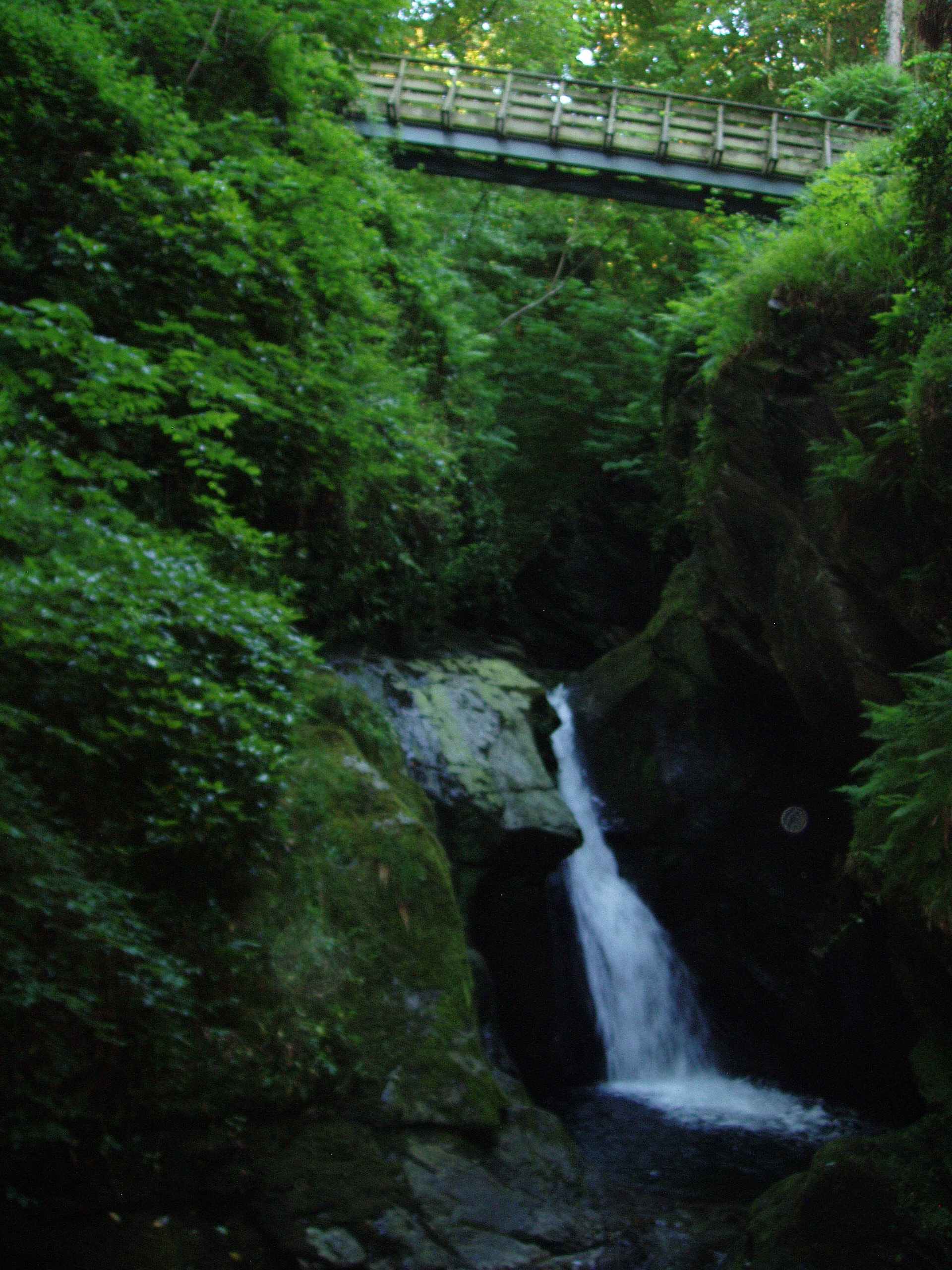
Waterfall in Glen Maye

Glen Maye (or Glenmaye, Manx: Glion Muigh or Glion Meay – Luxuriant Glen) is a glen and a small village on the west coast of the Isle of Man, 2 1/2 miles (4 km) south of Peel. The village is connected to Peel by a bus service.

It is home to the glen of the same name, which is well known for its picturesque waterfall and the sheltered and fern-filled woodland walk through the glen to the small pebble beach on the coast. At the bottom of the glen is the Mona Erin wheelcase, the only visible evidence of the mining that took place here between 1740 and 1870. The glen comprises some 11.5 acres (47,000 m^{2}) situated on either side of the Rushen River (not to be confused with the Silverburn River which is Awin Rosien (Rushen River) in Manx Gaelic), and came into Manx National Heritage ownership in 1960. Glen Maye is one of the officially-listed Manx National Glens.

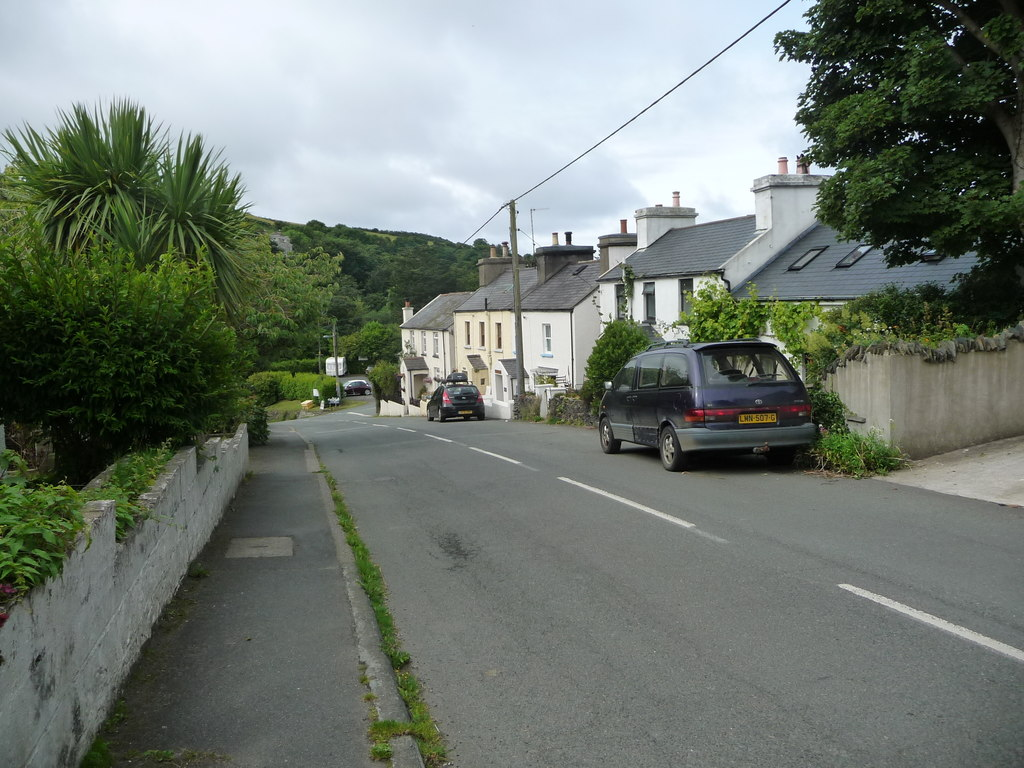
Glen Maye village

The village is also known for its public house, The Waterfall Hotel, located at the entrance to the glen and near the waterfall itself.

== Filmography ==
Raby Mooar farm house located in Glen Maye featured in the 1998 film Waking Ned.
