= Mooinjer veggey =

Fairy creatures in Manx folklore

Mooinjer veggey is the Manx for little people, a term used for fairies in Gaelic lore. The equivalent Irish and Scottish Gaelic are Muintir Bheaga and Muinntir Bheaga.

== Manx folklore ==
In Manx folklore, the mooinjer veggey are small creatures ranging 2–3 ft (0.61–0.91 m) in height, otherwise very like mortals. They wear red caps and green jackets and are most often seen on horseback followed by packs of little hounds of all the colours of the rainbow. They are rather inclined to be mischievous and spiteful.

The phrase is borrowed by the Anglo-Manx dialect to refer to fairies. Belief in fairies is or was formerly widespread in the Isle of Man. They live in green hillsides, more especially ancient tumuli. Anyone straying near these on a fine summer's evening would probably hear delightful music; but he must take care, especially if he is a musician, not to linger lest he should be entrapped. They are visible to people only when they choose. Some of them are benevolent, curing men of diseases and delivering them from misfortune. Others are malevolent, stealing children, even abducting adults, and bringing misfortune.

It was an old custom to keep a fire burning in the house during the night, so that the Fairies might come in and enjoy it. It is said that on dark, dismal and stormy nights, in the mountain parts of parishes, the people would retire earlier to rest, in order to allow to the weather-beaten Fairies the unwatched enjoyment of the smouldering embers of the turf fire. It was also customary to leave some bread out for the Fairies, and to fill the water crocks with clean water for them before going to bed. This water was never used for any other purpose, and thrown out in the morning. Manxwomen would not spin on Saturday evenings, as this was deemed displeasing to the mooinjer veggey, and at every baking and churning a small piece of dough and butter was stuck on the wall for their consumption. Both salt and iron were considered efficacious against malevolent charms.

== Manx language education ==
Mooinjer Veggey is the name of a charity on the Isle of Man that operates several Manx language pre-school playgroups and nurseries, with the aim of helping young Manx children to grow up bilingual. The charity also operates a Manx language primary school, Bunscoill Ghaelgagh, at St John's, under contract from the Department of Education.

== See also ==
- Language revival
- Language nest
- Sleih beggey
