= Buggane =

Isle of Mann folklore figure

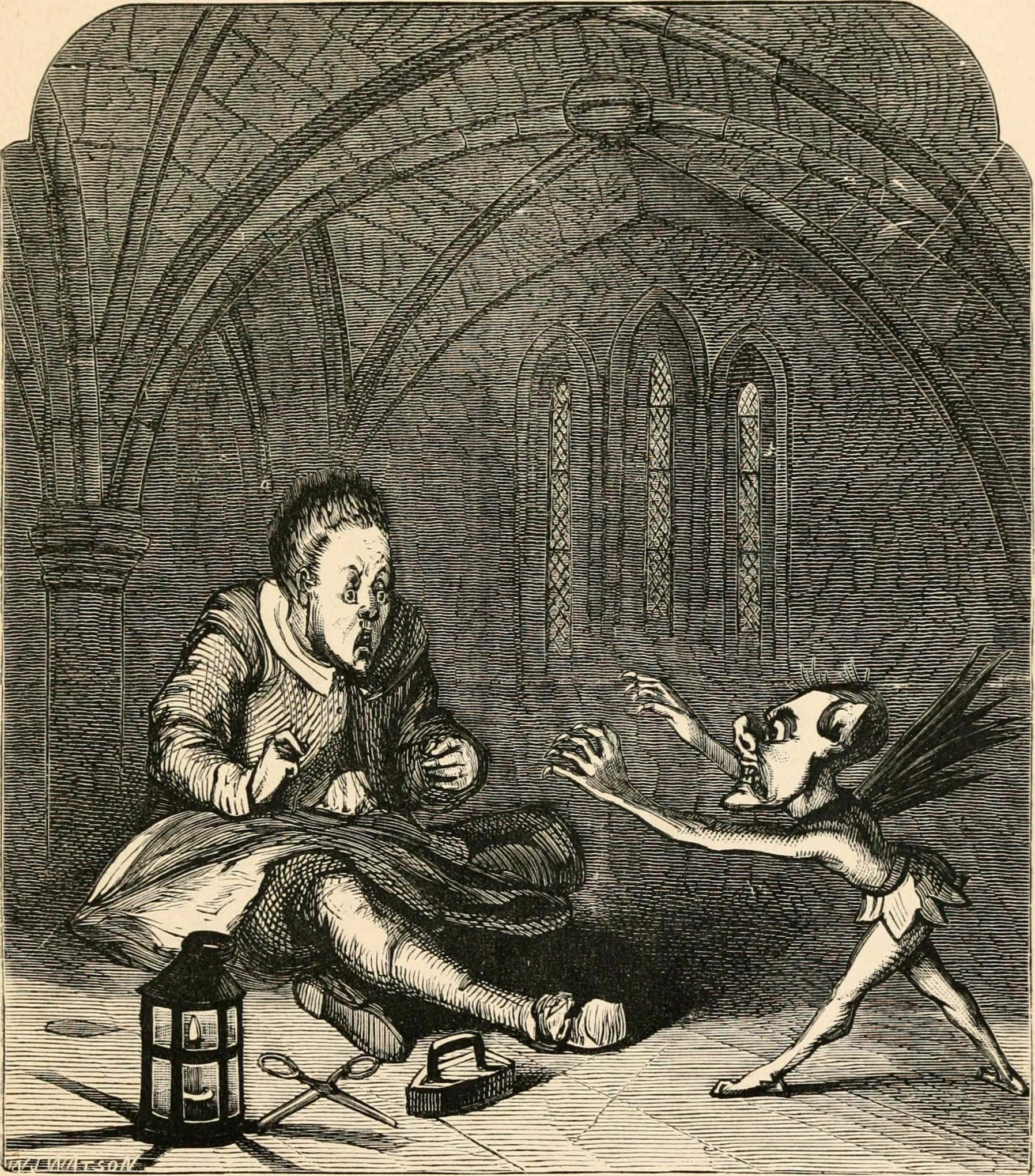
TIM MVLREA AND THE BUGGANE (The Phynodderree, and other legends of the Isle of Man (1882))

In Manx folklore, a buggane (or boagane) was a huge ogre-like creature native to the Isle of Man. Some have considered them akin to the Scandinavian troll.

== Manx folklore ==
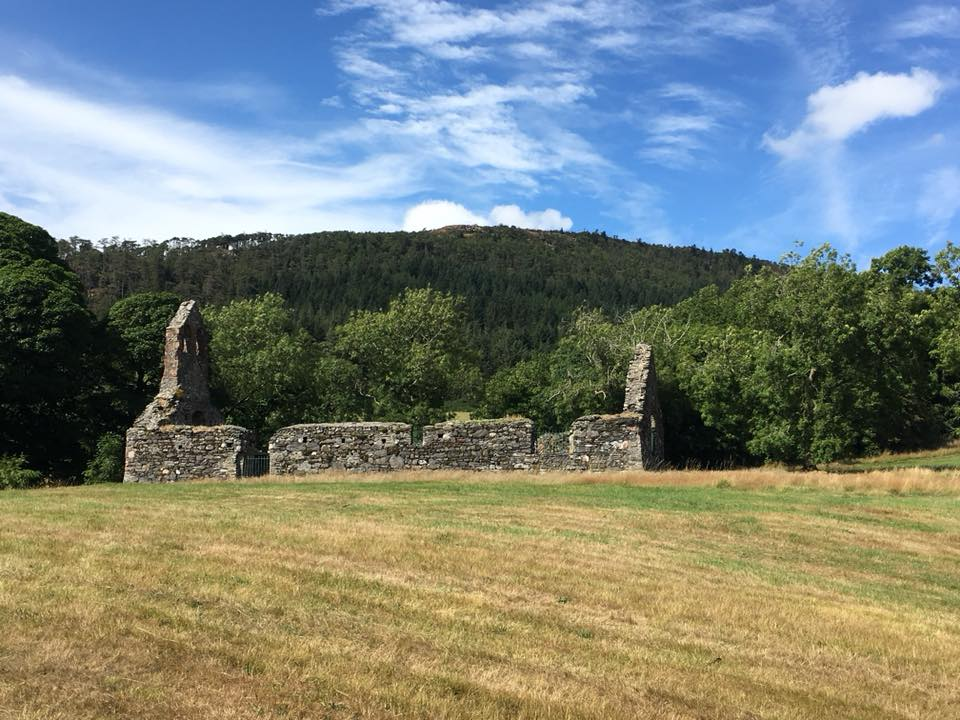
Roofless St.Trinian's with Greeba Mountain in the background

A shapeshifter, the buggane is generally described as a malevolent being that can appear as a large black calf or human with ears or hooves of a horse. It was large enough to tear the roof off a church. Its natural form is described as "covered with a mane of coarse, black hair; it had eyes like torches, and glittering sharp tusks". Another tale describes it as a huge man with bull's horns, glowing eyes and large teeth.

As magical creatures, bugganes were unable to cross water or stand on hallowed ground.

=== St Trinian's Church ===
The most famous story recounts a buggane who found himself an inadvertent stowaway on a ship bound for Ireland. Determined to return to the Isle of Man, he caused a storm and guided the ship towards the rocky coast of Contrary Head. His plan was interdicted through the intervention of St. Trinian. Invoked by the captain with a promise to build a chapel in his honour, the saint guided the ship safely into Peel Harbour. Incensed, the buggane screamed, "St. Trinian should never have a whole church in Ellan Vannin." When the chapel came to be built, three times the local people put a roof on, and three times the buggane tore it off.

The Buggan ny Hushtey lived in a large cave near the sea and was known for having no liking for lazy people. However, it should not be confused with the Cabbyl-ushtey, the Manx water horse.

Bugganes were occasionally called upon by the fairies to punish people that had offended them. The buggane of Glen Maye would have pitched a lazy housewife into a waterfall for putting off baking until after sunset, had she not cut loose the strings of her apron to escape. The buggane from Gob-na-Scuit was known for tearing the thatch off the haystacks, puffing the smoke down chimneys, and pushing sheep over the edge of the brooghs (a steep bank or grassy cliff).

=== Finn MacCool and the Buggane ===
In Manx legend, the Irish giant Fionn mac Cumhaill (Finn MacCool) crossed over to Mann and settled near Cregneash. The buggane from Barrule came to do battle, but Fionn did not want to fight. Fionn's wife, Oonagh, disguised Fionn as a baby and tucked him into a cradle. When the buggane saw the size of the 'baby', he thought that its father, Fionn, must be a giant among giants, and so he left. They eventually met near Kirk Christ Rushen and fought from sunrise to sunset. Fionn had one foot in the Big Sound, and so made the channel between the Calf of Man and Kitterland, and the other foot was in the Little Sound, and so he made the narrow channel between Kitterland and the main island. The buggane was standing at Port Erin. He came off victorious and slashed Fionn awfully, so that he had to run to Ireland. Fionn could walk on the sea, but the buggane could not, so he tore out a tooth and threw it at Fionn. It hit him on the back of the head, and then it fell into the sea and became what is now called Chicken Rock. Fionn turned round and roared a mighty curse, "My seven swearings of a curse on it!" "Let it lie there for a vexation to the sons of men while water runs and grass grows!" And so it has. The Irish version of the story has Fionn's adversary a giant from Scotland.

== In popular culture ==
- Bushys (Mount Murray Brewing) of Douglas, Isle of Man, brews a light brown English bitter called "Bushy's Buggane".
- Stories from the Isle of Man: The Buggane of St. Trinian's, featured in Season 6 (8 August 1969) of the BBC children's television series Jackanory.
- In the Spook's series by Joseph Delaney, a buggane features prominently in the seventh book, The Spook's Nightmare (UK title)/Rise of the Huntress (US title).
- Buggane is featured in the fantasy novel The Road To Fero City by Morat, in which he is imprisoned for vandalising churches.
- In the Pathfinder Roleplaying Game, Buggane make an appearance in the Bestiary 4 as a race of blind giants distantly related to ogres. Their appearance is inspired by that of the naked mole-rat.
- In the 2009 Lemon Demon song "Eighth Wonder" (about Gef the talking mongoose) on the 2016 album Spirit Phone, buggane are referenced in the lyrics as they both originate on the Isle of Man.
