= Robert Corteen Carswell =

Manx writer

Bob Carswell RBV
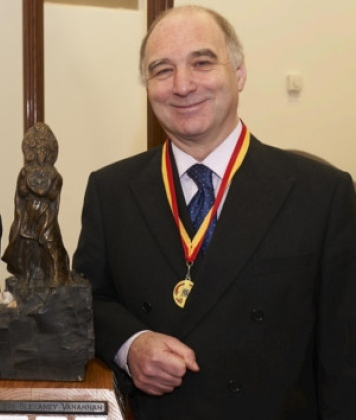
- Bob Carswell in 2013 with the Reih Bleeaney Vanannan trophy
- Born: Robert Corteen Carswell; 1950 (age 75–76)
- Occupations: Radio presenter, author
- Awards: Reih Bleeaney Vanannan 2013

Robert Corteen Carswell RBV (born 1950) is a Manx language and culture activist, writer and radio presenter. In 2013 he received the Manx Heritage Foundation's Reih Bleeaney Vanannan award for outstanding contributions to Manx culture.

== Broadcasting ==
Bob Carswell was introduced to Manx in a written form at an early age, through the classic Manx texts of Edmund Goodwin's First Lessons in Manx and a 1775 edition of Conaant Noa (the New Testament). In his early twenties he became a member and then a committee member of Yn Çheshaght Ghailckagh (The Manx Language Society). It was through this association that he first came into broadcasting in the early 1970s, when he volunteered to create content for the weekly 15 minute slots allotted to Manx language programming on Manx Radio. His contributions included news and comment, but also original comic vignettes, short plays and documentaries.

Carswell is a member of the Gaelic Broadcasting Committee, and is today considered to be one of the most important voices in Manx broadcasting. His current programme for the radio is Claare ny Gael, a weekly programme that "looks at Manx life and culture through a wealth of traditional Manx and Gaelic music". He has previously produced the programmes Traa dy Liooar ("Time enough") and Shiaght Laa ("Seven days").

== Writing ==
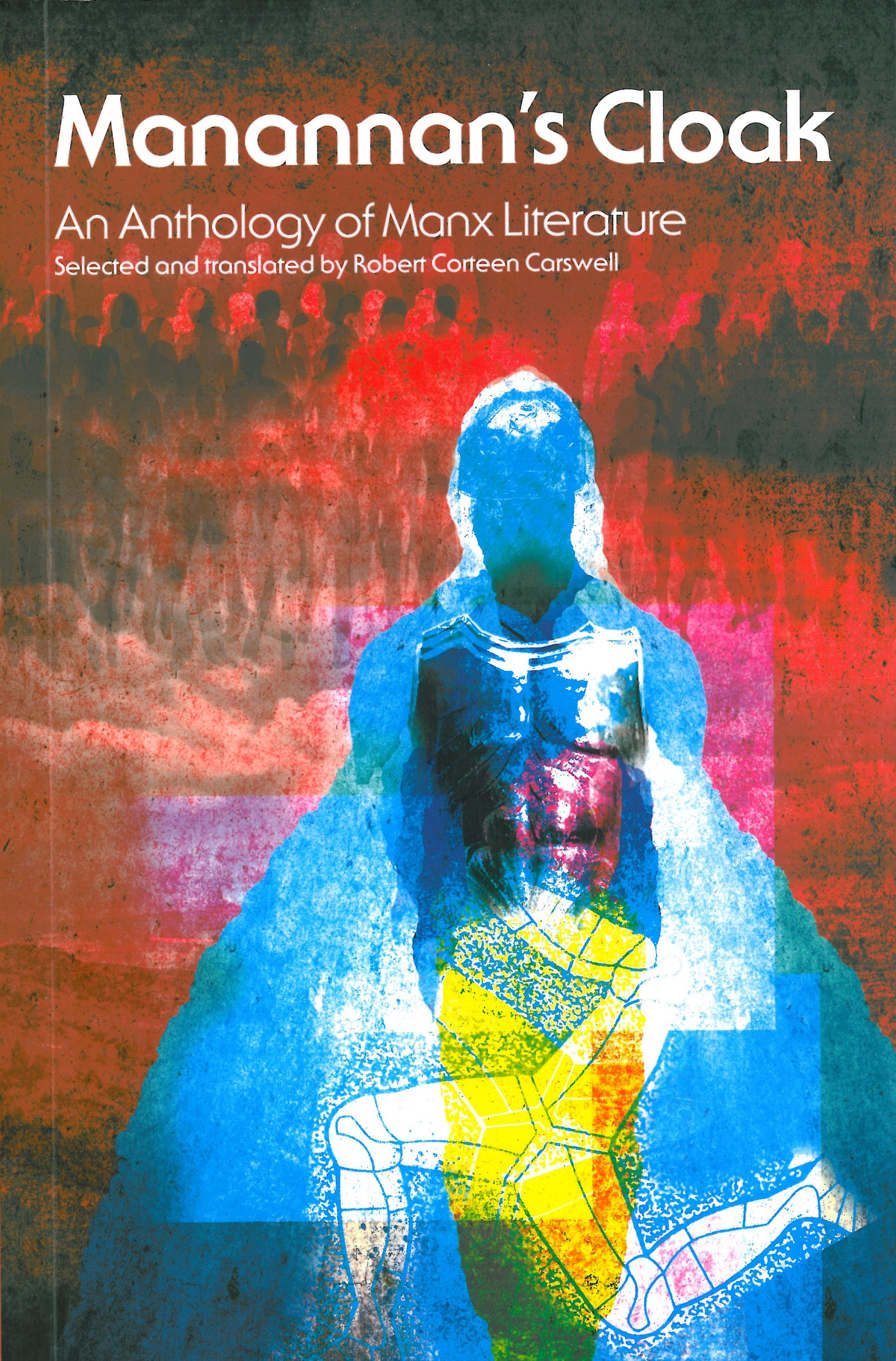
The front cover of Manannan's Cloak: An Anthology of Manx Literature

Bob Carswell is a poet and writer, especially significant for his contributions to contemporary Manx literature. In addition to his writing for radio since the early 1970s, Carswell contributed most of the content for the weekly Manx language column, Cree ny Cooish ('The Heart of the Matter'), which appeared in the Isle of Man Weekly Times between 1982 and 1984. Most of the contributions were translations of stories, official notices, jokes, magazine pieces and encyclopaedia articles, as well as historic material and some original creative writing. Carswell contributed a similar variety of content to the magazine, FRITLAG, which was published for 14 editions between 1983 and 1987. He has also contributed many poems and other pieces to other publications and to events such as Yn Chruinnaght. Carswell has had a number of poetry books published, including Shelg yn Drane (1994) and Arraneyn 'sy Ghaelg (1996).

Carswell is an authority on Manx literature. In 2010 he edited Manannan's Cloak: An Anthology of Manx Literature. The book traces Manx literature from its earliest appearances through to the present day, connecting the bilingual extracts with a commentary that places them in the context of Manx history. The book is the first full-scale collection of Manx literature, and as such it is a highly significant contribution to Manx culture and identity.

Within Manannan's Cloak, Carswell includes the following example of his own poetry:

Irree Ny Greiney / Sunrise [extract]
Çhiassid ny greiney ayns Mannin veg veen. Ta'n çheer as y cheayn nyn Ihie ec fea. Tashid y voghree vees girree myr gaal, As jannoo craa-skell ayns çhiass vynlaa. Cho souyr ta'n Ellan 'syn 'astyr mie. Ta'n Sourey çheet gys çheer my ghraih. Çhiassid ny greiney ayns Mannin veg veen. Ta'n çheer as y cheayn nyn Ihie ec fea.	The warmth of the sun in dear little Mannin. The land and the sea are lying at rest. The dampness of the morning is rising as a vapour, And causing a shimmer in the noon heat. So comfortable is the Island in the fine afternoon. The Summer is coming to the land I love. The warmth of the sun in dear little Mannin. The land and the sea are lying at rest.

== Music ==
Bob Carswell is highly involved in Manx music, through his songwriting and performance, as both dancer and musician, and also through his voluntary work for the Manx Heritage Foundation. His songs have been arranged and recorded by local groups including the Mollag Band, Caarjyn Cooidjagh and Barrule, and he has been commissioned to write new songs for primary schools on the island. He has danced with the Manx Folk Dance Society, Bock Yuan Fannee and Bock Bane and continues to play music at sessions and with the Calor Gas Ceilidh Band.

== Teaching ==
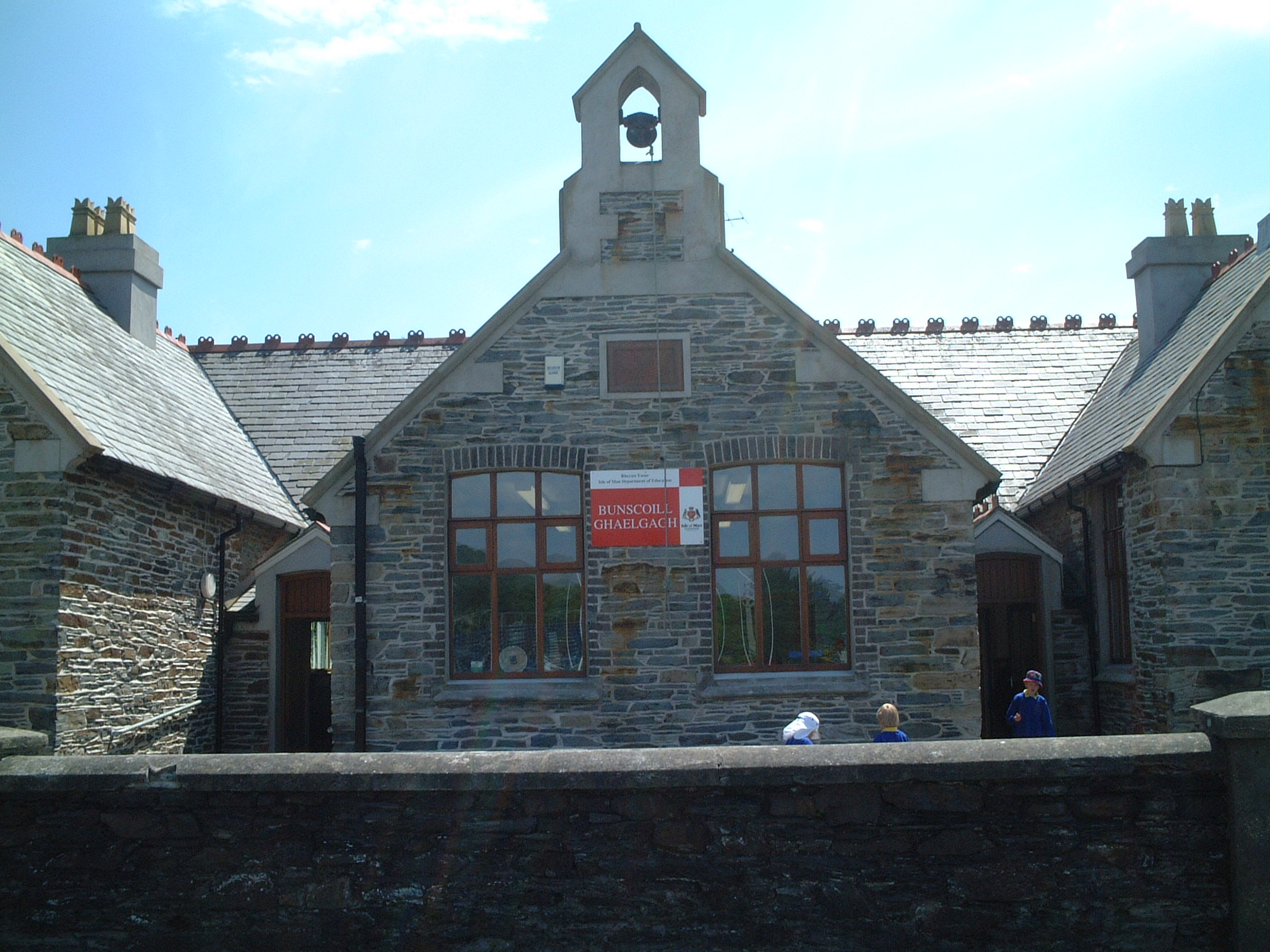
Bunscoill Ghaelgagh

In 1983 Bob Carswell began researching, revising and devising stories and rhymes for the Manx-language playgroup that was run by his first wife, Peg. Since 2006 he has been working as translator and creator of Manx language resources for the Bunscoill Ghaelgagh. He also creates similar resources for Unnid Gaelgagh (Manx Language Unit). His role in non-classroom Manx education includes involvement in media projects such as Caarjyn as Fennee (children's cartoons) and producing YouTube broadcasts on aspects of culture.

== Other cultural work ==
Bob Carswell has a long-standing relationship with Manx music, culture and language festivals like Yn Chruinnaght and the Cooish, where he helps on a voluntary basis with the organisation.

In 2013 he was awarded the Manx Heritage Foundation's annual award, Reih Bleeaney Vanannan (Manannan's Choice of the Year), for outstanding contributions to Manx culture. Carswell's contribution was summed up in the report of the award in the Manx newspapers:

“Described as one of the most knowledgeable and modest of men, Bob is a skilled poet, songwriter and translator, a fine musician, singer, and historian. Through his work in broadcasting and education he has made his deep understanding of Manx culture, language and history accessible to a wide audience.”

Also in 2013 Bob Carswell was appointed Yn Lhaihder (The Reader) for Tynwald Day, described by Clare Christian, the President of Tynwald, as "a role central to reaffirming the Manx identity of the formal proceedings of our national day."
