= Claare ny Gael =

- Running time: Sundays, 8:00pm-9:00pm
- Country of origin: Isle of Man
- Languages: Manx and English
- Home station: Manx Radio
- Starring: Robert Corteen Carswell
- Created by: Robert Corteen Carswell
- Recording studio: Douglas, Isle of Man
- Audio format: FM and MW radio and online
- Website: https://www.manxradio.com/on-air/claare-ny-gael/

Claare ny Gael is a bilingual radio show presented by Robert Corteen Carswell and broadcast on Sunday evenings each week on Manx Radio.

Both produced and presented by Carswell since the programme's inception in the late 1970s, the show mixes music from the Celtic Nations with presentations on issues of interest to the Isle of Man, including the Manx language, history, contemporary events and many other aspects of Manx culture. Each episode follows two threads - one in Manx and the other in English - which are distinct from one another and which can carry over a number of episodes.

The show has support through the Broadcasting Act passed by Tynwald in 1993, which requires a commitment from Manx Radio to broadcast a certain number of hours in Manx Gaelic, the native language of the Isle of Man. This is administered through the Gaelic Broadcasting Committee, which has been the responsibility of Culture Vannin since April 2016. Although the Gaelic Broadcasting Committee directly sponsors Moghrey Jedoonee and the Manx language news service on Manx Radio, it does not support Claare ny Gael directly.

Topics covered by Claare ny Gael include: the annual Illiam Dhone commemoration; artists performing in Shennaghys Jiu and Yn Chruinnaght; a reading of A Book of Manx Poetry edited by William Cubbon; a reading of Colin Jerry's Ny Tree Muckeyn Beggey; a reading of a Manx translation of Casino Royale; and regular date-specific features on Manx history and customs.
