= Coonceil ny Gaelgey =

Manx language organisation

- Manx Language Advisory Council
- Abbreviation: CnG
- Formation: December 1985
- Headquarters: Fairfield House, Main Road, St John's IM4 3NA
- Region served: Isle of Man
- Fields: Manx language promotion, translation services
- Secretary General: Chris Sheard
- Parent organization: Culture Vannin
- Website: translations@culturevannin.im

Coonceil ny Gaelgey (English: Manx Language Advisory Council) is the regulatory body responsible for the creation and provision of authoritative street names and titles in the Manx language for use on the Isle of Man.

== History ==
Coonceil ny Gaelgey was set up in December 1985 as a sub-committee of the Manx Heritage Foundation. It is responsible for the provision of authoritative Manx versions of the titles of government departments and street names, and the creation of new words and phrases.

Initially, it was intended that there would be five members on the Coonceil, however, when Doug Faragher died in 1987 no appointment was made to replace him until 1996 when Brian Stowell was appointed. Since then the number of members has increased and includes prominent figures in the Manx speaking community such as Bob Carswell and Phil Gawne.

== Purpose ==
The Coonceil is currently a sub-committee of Culture Vannin which aims to support private, public and voluntary organisations by providing a translation service between English and Manx. The translation service is generally free for on-island use.

It also has published word-lists for newly create words and terms for the Manx language. The Manx Language Strategy 2017-2021 aims to raise the profile of Culture Vannin's translation service, which incorporates the expertise of Coonceil ny Gaelgey.''
