= Gaelic-medium education =

Gaelic medium education may refer to:

- Gaelic-medium education in Ireland
- Gaelic-medium education on the Isle of Man
- Gaelic-medium education in Scotland
