= Cooish =

Manx language festival

- The Cooish logo
- Genre: Cultural, language
- Frequency: Mostly annual, with some fallow years
- Locations: Peel, St John's, Douglas
- Country: Isle of Man
- Years active: 29–30 years
- Established: 1996
- Founder: Phil Gawne
- Most recent: 12 November 2020 – 14 November 2020

The Cooish is the name of a festival similar to the traditional Welsh Eisteddfod that promotes Manx language, it's literature, and culture that takes place on the Isle of Man each November. The word 'Cooish' is a Manx word that has many meanings. It can translate to mean a chat, a meeting, a cause, an issue, or a get-together.

== History ==
The festival was founded by Phil Gawne in the 1996 under the name Feailley Ghaelgagh (Manx Language Festival), following a research trip to Scottish Gaelic development agencies in Inverness and the Isle of Skye. Feailley Ghaelgagh was later renamed The Cooish.

The Feailley Ghaelgagh became an important feature of Manx cultural life and throughout the 1990s and 2000s and was a week long festival during this period. It later reverted to a two-day festival which is the current length. By gaining support from local businesses and the Manx government, as well as employing extensive advertising, the festival has been able to "ensure that most people in the country are aware of the language."

After a period of fallow years, The Cooish was re-launched in 2017 in Peel by Adrian Cain, Yn Greinneyder:

The Cooish was really successful in promoting and raising the profile of Manx,’ said Adrian. ’But after a while I thought we were doing so much work promoting Manx language throughout the year that it seemed quite strange to say that we must do something in one particular week. So we left it for a while.

In 2018, the Londeyr (Lantern) Award for people who have made new efforts to promote the everyday use of the Manx language was launched. The award is given recognition of the efforts of members of the community who have been seen to use and support the use of the Manx language on a daily basis.

== Events ==
The Cooish is organised by Yn Çheshaght Ghailckagh with support from the Manx Heritage Foundation and the Isle of Man Arts Councils along with local businesses.

Most of the events that take during the festival are based around the Manx language and the encouragement of its use. Coffee mornings and Pop-Up Gaeltaghyn are used as an opportunity for people to practice their Manx in a casual, informal setting. There are language workshops to help people who are interested in learning or improving their Manx, as well as general information sessions for parents to discuss the advantages of bilingualism and of sending their child to the Bunscoill Ghaelgagh or Mooinjer Veggey.

Although the primary purpose of the Cooish is to promote the Manx language, it aims to bring together different elements of the Gaelic world to celebrate their shared heritage. Artists and musicians from other Gaelic countries frequently perform at Cooish events.

There are music and song writing workshops and as well as traditional dance and music performances throughout the festival. Evening pub sessions and concerts are also an important part of the festival.

The Cooish has also provided the space for new Manx language publications by Yn Çheshaght Ghailckagh to be launched, such as Christopher Lewin's Droghad ny Seihll and First Thousand Words in Manx.
