= 1368 AM =

AM radio frequency

The following radio stations broadcast on AM frequency 1368 kHz:

== Japan ==
- NHK AM

== United Kingdom ==
- Manx Radio Gold on the Isle of Man
