= Yn Chruinnaght =

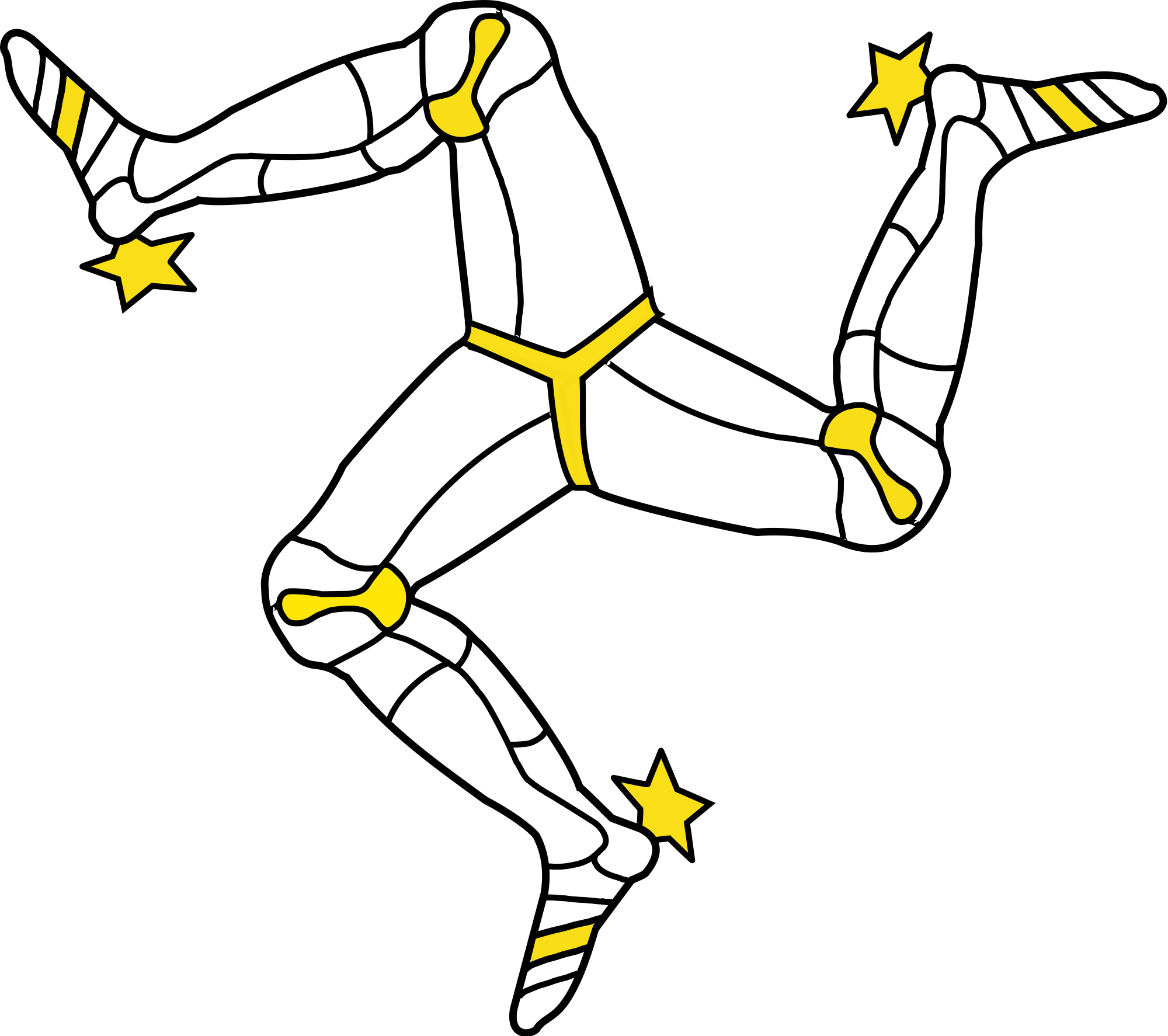
Emblem of the Isle of Man

Yn Chruinnaght (Manx for "the gathering") is a cultural festival in the Isle of Man which celebrates Manx music, Manx language and culture, and links with other Celtic cultures.

== Origin and history ==
The forerunner of Yn Chruinnaght was founded in 1924, and was known as Cruinnaght Vanninagh Ashoonagh ("Manx national gathering"). It was the idea of William Cubbon, the second Director of the Manx Museum, who was also the Honorary Treasurer of both Yn Çheshaght Ghailckagh (The Manx Gaelic Society) and the World Manx Association (WMA).

Programmes from the early festivals state that "Yn Cruinnaght Vanninagh Ashoonagh is held under the auspices of The World Manx Association and The Manx [Gaelic] Society in commemoration of our great National Poet and with the object of preserving national sentiment." The "great National Poet" referred to is Thomas Edward Brown (1830–1897) whose poems, including lengthy verse-stories in Manx dialect (of English, though with some Gaelic words), were published by Macmillan.

The Cruinnaght Vanninagh Ashoonagh was organised by William Cubbon through the WMA's Ellan Vannin magazine, which he edited. The festival was a one-day, competitive event held at Hollantide (Allhallowtide), with participants from the island (though at least one of the judges, Dr J E Lyon, came from "across", i.e. from outside the island). Members of the various sub-committees included Archibald Knox, J J Kneen and Mona Douglas. The event included singing (including in the Manx Gaelic language), music (including a grand concert as a finale), arts, crafts and cookery. The festival came to an end with the outbreak of the Second World War.

== Post-war revival ==
It was the aim of one of the leading figures in Manx traditional cultural affairs, Mona Douglas, to revive Yn Chruinnaght as a Manx national festival. A cultural revival starting in the late 1960s led to renewed vigour in the Manx language, in Manx traditional music, and particularly in Manx dancing. Mona recognised that Yn Chruinnaght could provide a focus for cultural activities and a way to give greater recognition to Manx traditional culture, particularly in the wider context of an inter-Celtic festival.

In 1977, Mona Douglas organised Feailley Vanninagh Rhumsaa (the "Ramsey Manx Festival") which was held on 1 September in collaboration with the Ellynyn ny Gael (Arts of the Gaels) organization. The programme's front cover bore the modern symbol of Yn Chruinnaght. The programme announced that the festival "will be revived in Ramsey August–September 1978, and this time it will be a five-day Inter-Celtic Festival". It was held on 21–25 August 1978. Mona Douglas's programme note in 1979 states that "It was decided to stage Yn Chruinnaght in Ramsey, the only town in the Island which had no important festival of its own, and which, like Peel, was a recognized centre of the national revival."

== Inter-Celtic festival ==
Whereas Cruinnaght Vanninagh Ashoonagh had been a festival only of Manx culture, Mona Douglas conceived Yn Chruinnaght in its modern form as an inter-Celtic festival, giving an opportunity for the six Celtic nations of the Isle of Man, Brittany, Ireland, Scotland, Wales and Cornwall to participate. Mona Douglas was particularly pleased to receive official recognition for Yn Chruinnaght from Oireachtas na Gaeilge in Ireland, Gorsedd y Beirdd and Yr Eisteddfod Genedlaethol in Wales and Am Mòd in Scotland.

Events have been held throughout the island as part of Yn Chruinnaght, but the main focus from 1978 to 2006 was the town of Ramsey. The relationship of Yn Chruinnaght with Ramsey has been an important factor over the years. The festival enjoyed venues and facilities throughout the town, including a variety of hotels and the Town Hall, various churches and even the livestock mart. As many of these venues and facilities ceased to be available, a marquee became a feature of the festival. However, with the usual plot in Ramsey for a marquee no longer available in 2007, Yn Chruinnaght had to reconsider its siting. In 2007, the main focus moved to the Centenary Centre in Peel.

The development of traditional arts in the Isle of Man has continued apace since the late 1960s. Mona Douglas recognised that the energy associated with it could be harnessed to revive Yn Chruinnaght. Further development would undoubtedly have taken place in its own way. However, Yn Chruinnaght has provided a focus for thinking about and arranging traditional music, and has been the spur for new creative work drawing on traditional themes.

== See also ==
Cooish, another festival organised by Yn Çheshaght Ghailckagh.
