= Culture Vannin =

Organization

Coordinates: 54.203107°N 4.641731°W

- Formation: 1982
- Founder: Isle of Man Government
- Type: Manx culture Manx language Manx music Gaelic revival
- Headquarters: Isle of Man
- Website: culturevannin.im

Culture Vannin is the trading name for the Manx Heritage Foundation, established in 1982 by the Isle of Man Government to promote Manx culture, heritage and language. It was rebranded in February 2014, having previously been known as the "Manx Heritage Foundation" (Manx: Undinys Eiraght Vannin), since the former title "held connotations more towards the cultural history of the island" which were not felt to be accurate to the organisation's progressive approach to invigorating Manx culture. Culture Vannin's motto is "Taking our culture forward".

== Organisation ==
The management board of the Foundation consists of two MHKs appointed by Tynwald, three members of the general public nominated by the Council of Ministers and approved by Tynwald, and a representative from both the Isle of Man Arts Council and Manx National Heritage. It is chaired by Chris Thomas MHK.

The Foundation currently employs four members staff:

- Director: Dr Breesha Maddrell
- Manx Language Development Officer: Ruth Keggin Gell
- Manx Music Development Officer: Dr Chloë Woolley

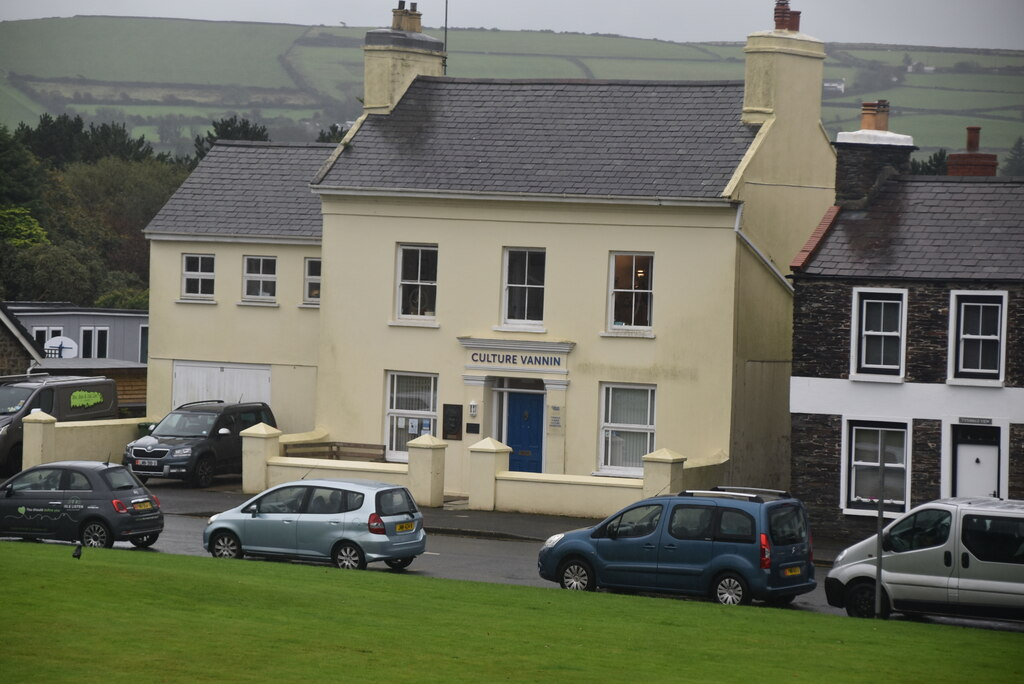
Culture Vannin in St John's

Its offices are based in Fairfield House, St John's, opposite Tynwald Hill and next to Bunscoill Ghaelgagh. Having announced plans for this relocation in June 2015, Culture Vannin opened its doors to the public at Fairfield House on Tynwald Day 2016. It was previously located at The Nunnery, Douglas.

== Activities ==
Culture Vannin's policy states that its four main aims are:

1) To identify the unique areas of Manx Heritage and Culture and;
2) To find practical ways of making them relevant to today's society;
3) To support the Manx identity and contemporary Manx culture.

The Foundation sets out to achieve these aims by offering financial assistance through grants or loans, by undertaking and commissioning its own research/publishing, and by offering practical advice and assistance where appropriate.

The Foundation considers Manx culture to include all of the following: crafts, language, history, natural history, music, literature, folk-lore, art, folk dance, architecture, archaeology, industrial development, law and ecology.

Examples of key work carried out by the Foundation includes:

- The awarding of Reih Bleeaney Vanannan (Manannan's Choice of the Year) in recognition of an outstanding contribution to Manx culture. This has been awarded annually since 1987.
- Support of events that celebrate the Manx language, music and dance, including: Shennaghys Jiu, Yn Chruinnaght, Cooish and Bree.
- The publication or support for publication of a number of books, CDs and DVDs.
- Commissioning and supporting a number of oral history projects.
