= Bunscoill Ghaelgagh =

Coordinates: 54.2029°N 4.6411°W

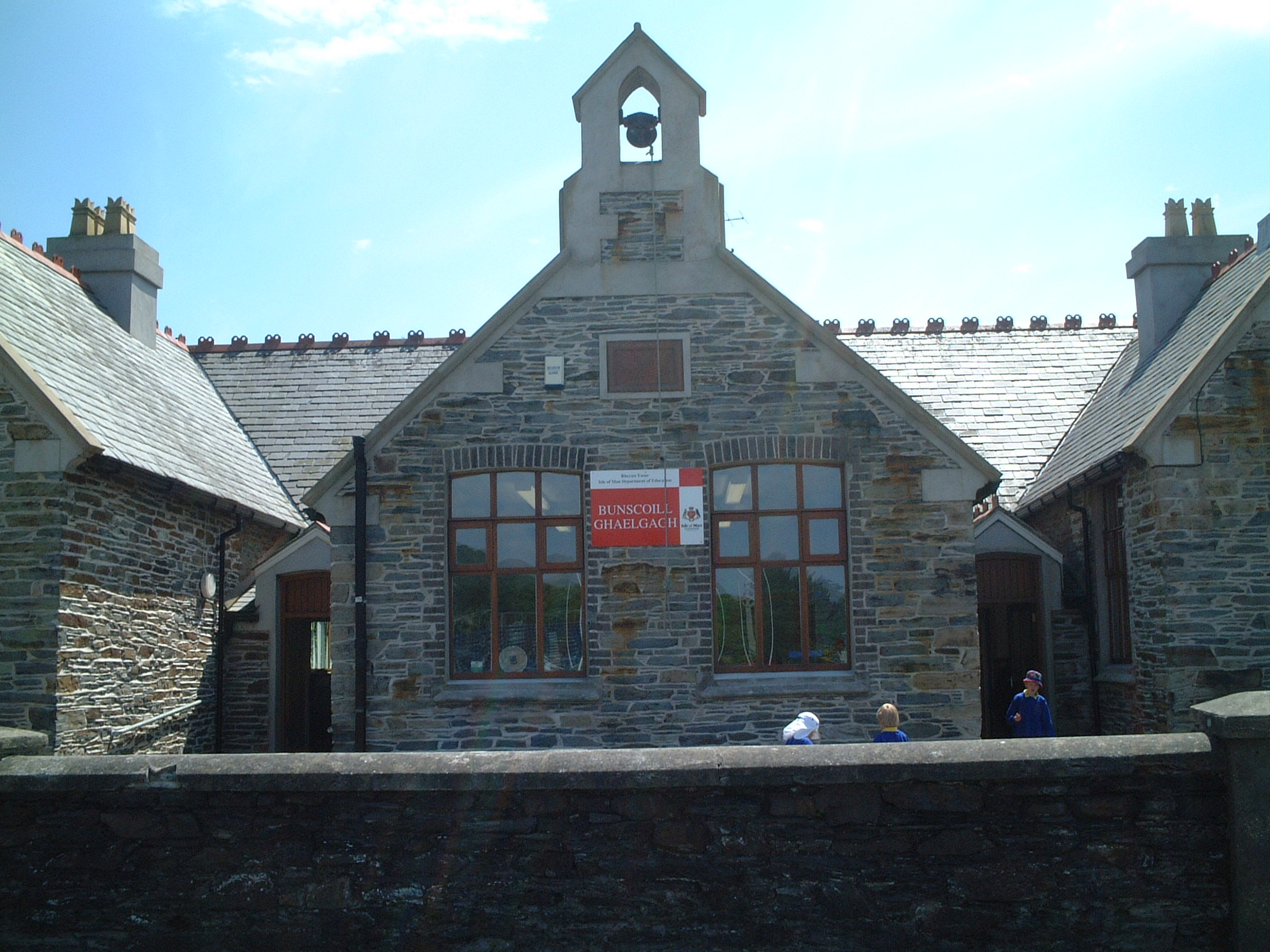
- St John's, Isle of Man

Information
- Type: Manx language primary school
- Established: 2001
- Local authority: Isle of Man
- Headteacher: Julie Matthews
- Staff: c. 4
- Gender: Mixed
- Enrollment: 69
- Language: Manx
- Website: https://bunscoillghaelgagh.sch.im/

Bunscoill Ghaelgagh is a government-run Manx-language primary school in St John's, Isle of Man, that has enabled 170 children to learn fluent Manx. As of 2011 it is the only school in the world where children are taught their lessons solely in Manx and which allows children to learn the language fluently. Pupils may then go on to Queen Elizabeth II High School in Peel where they can study a GCSE equivalent qualification (Teisht Chadjin Ghaelgagh) in Manx as well as up to two subjects in the language to maintain their fluency, or to the high school in their catchment area.

== History ==
In 1999 a parents' society, Sheshaght ny Paarantyn, was formed with an interest in establishing a Manx-language school. That year they approached the Isle of Man's Department of Education with their request. The school opened in September 2001. At the time it had one class and shared premises at Ballacottier School in Douglas. In January 2003 it moved to its own building in the old St John's School.

The school won the annual Reih Bleeaney Vanannan award in January 2006 for its efforts in preserving and promoting Manx language, culture and heritage. It was presented by the then Speaker of the House of Keys, James "Tony" Brown, chairman of the Manx Heritage Foundation.

=== Enrolment ===
Numbers continued to increase, from nine in 2001 when the school moved to its current premises to 47 in 2006, then to 65 in 2009 and 69 in 2012.

== Manx language ==
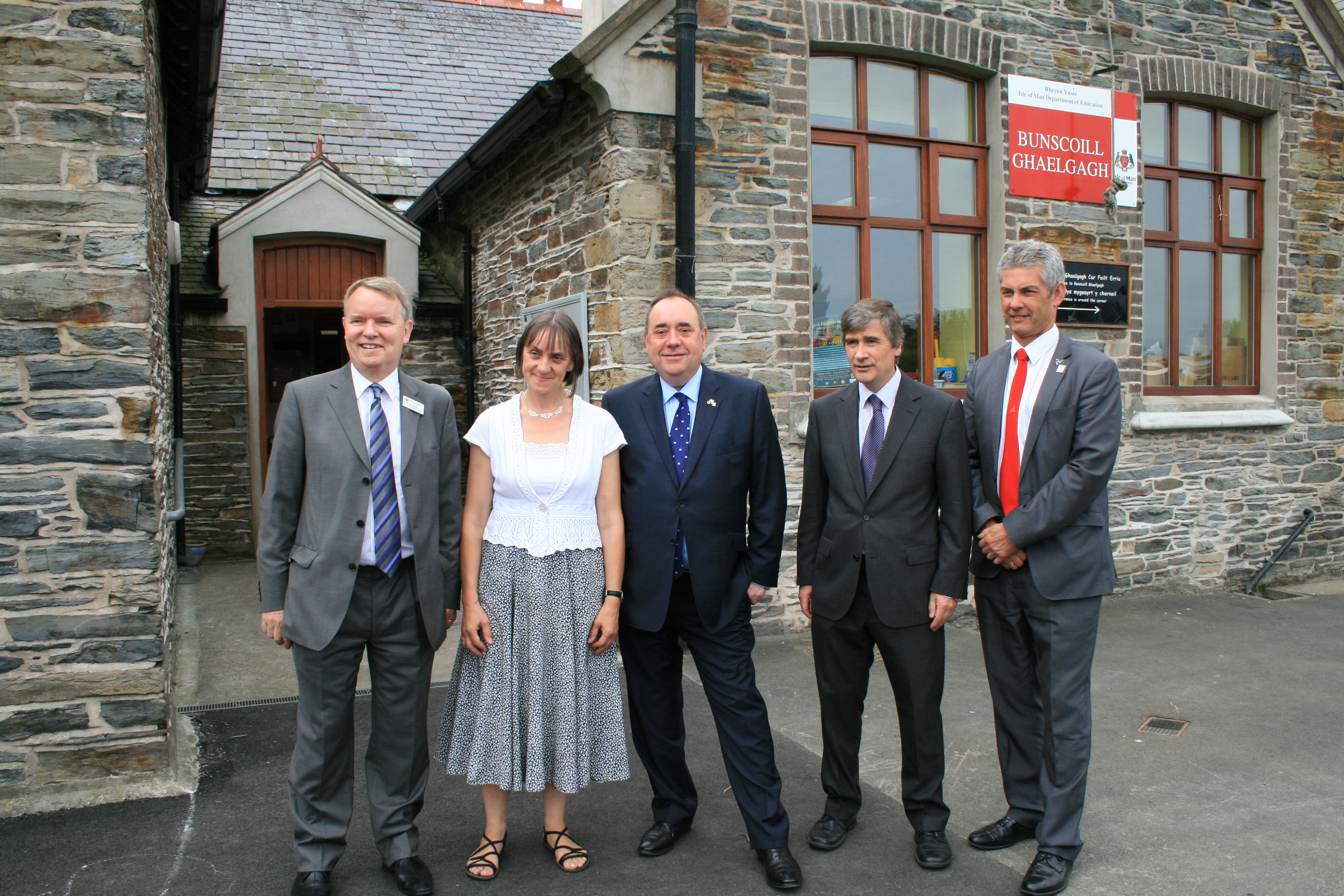
First Minister of Scotland Alex Salmond visiting the school in 2013

The school is considered successful and is part of the Manx language revival. After UNESCO listed the language as extinct in 2009, pupils wrote letters asking "If our language is extinct then what language are we writing in?", and the classification was later changed to "critically endangered". Lewis Carroll's Alice in Wonderland (Ealish ayns Çheer ny Yindyssyn) is read in translation after 30 copies were presented to the Bunscoill Ghaelgagh by the Manx Gaelic Society when the book was officially launched.

The school itself refers to studies that have been made in Finland that demonstrate advantages from bilingual education. Researcher Aini-Kristiina Jäppinen examined the achievement of 334 pupils in 12 schools on "content and language-integrated learning" programmes and compared them with 334 pupils studying only in Finnish. She concluded that a foreign language adds to the learning process and seems to improve results. According to Jäppinen, "When pupils have to conceptualise and grasp issues in a foreign language as well as their mother tongue, it will help develop an ability to understand complex and multifaceted relationships between various themes." The Finnish research used pupils who were studying three different languages (French, Swedish and English) and found that "the choice of (Second) language did not seem to have a major impact on performance" in a number of subjects including maths and geography. As the school notes, this conclusion is not universal to other previous studies. Studies at Luton University have shown that there can be a "trivial" delay in language development but the overall benefits in the long run outweigh this temporary disadvantage.

== See also ==
- Bilingual education
- Gaelic medium education – Scottish Gaelic medium education
- Gaelscoil – Irish medium education
- Language nest
