= Manx language =

Goidelic Celtic language of the Isle of Man

Manx
- Manx Gaelic
- Gaelg, y Ghaelg; Gailck, y Ghailck
- Pronunciation: [ɡɪlʲɡʲ] (Gaelg); [ɡɪlʲkʲ] (Gailck); [əˈɣɪlʲɡʲ] (y Ghaelg); [əˈɣɪlʲkʲ] (y Ghailk) (Note: Pronunciations include /ɡilʲɡʲ/, /ɡelʲɡʲ/, /ɡilʲkʲ/, /ɡelʲkʲ/ .)
- Native to: Isle of Man
- Ethnicity: Manx
- Extinct: 27 December 1974, with the death of Ned Maddrell; Undergoing revitalisation
- Revival: L1: 59 (2001); 0? (2023); Total (L1+L2): 2,223 (2021)
- Language family: Indo-European: Celtic; Insular Celtic; Goidelic; Manx
- Early forms: Primitive Irish: Old Irish; Middle Irish
- Dialects: Northern; Southern

Official status
- Official language in: Isle of Man
- Regulated by: Coonceil ny Gaelgey (Manx Language Advisory Council)

Language codes
- ISO 639-1: gv
- ISO 639-2: glv
- ISO 639-3: glv
- ISO 639-6: glvx (historical) rvmx (revived)
- Glottolog: manx1243
- ELP: Manx
- Linguasphere: 50-AAA-aj
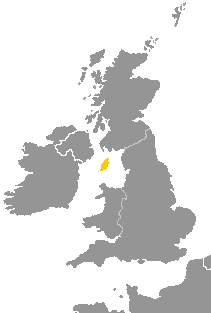

- Manx is classified as Critically Endangered by the UNESCO Atlas of the World's Languages in Danger.

- Person: Manninagh
- People: Manninee
- Language: Gaelg/Gailck; Glare Chowree
- Country: Isle of Man (Mannin, Ellan Vannin)

A Manx speaker, recorded in the Isle of Man

Manx (endonym: Gaelg, y Ghaelg or Gailck, y Ghailck, pronounced [ɡilʲkʲ, ə ˈɣilʲkʲ]), also known as Manx Gaelic, is a Gaelic language of the insular Celtic branch of the Celtic language family, itself a branch of the Indo-European language family. Manx is the heritage language of the Manx people.

Although no children native to the Isle of Man speak Manx as a first language, there has been a steady increase in the number of speakers since 1974, when Ned Maddrell, considered the last speaker to grow up in a Manx-speaking community environment, died. Despite this, the language has never fallen completely out of use, with a minority having some knowledge of it as a heritage language, and it is still an important part of the island's culture and cultural heritage.

Manx is often cited as a good example of language revitalization efforts; in 2021, around 2,023 people had varying levels of second-language conversational ability. Since the late 20th century, Manx has become more visible on the island, with increased signage, radio broadcasts and a Manx-medium primary school. The revival of Manx has been made easier because the language was well recorded, e.g. the Bible and the Book of Common Prayer had been translated into Manx, and audio recordings had been made of native speakers.

== Names ==
=== In Manx ===
The endonym of the language is Gaelg/Gailck, which shares the same etymology as the word "Gaelic", as do the endonyms of its sister languages: Irish (Gaeilge) and Scottish Gaelic (Gàidhlig). Manx frequently uses the forms y Ghaelg/y Ghailck (with definite article), as do Irish (an Ghaeilge) and Scottish Gaelic (a' Ghàidhlig).

To distinguish it from the two other forms of Gaelic, the phrases Gaelg/Gailck Vannin "Gaelic of Mann" and Gaelg/Gailck Vanninnagh "Manx Gaelic" are also used. In addition, the nickname Çhengey ny Mayrey, lit. "the mother's tongue" is occasionally used.

=== In English ===
The language is usually referred to in English as "Manx". The term "Manx Gaelic" is often used, for example when discussing the relationship between the three Goidelic languages (Irish, Scottish Gaelic, and Manx) or to avoid confusion with Manx English, the form of English spoken on the island. A feature of Manx English deriving from Gaelic is the use of the definite article, e.g. "the Manx", "the Gaelic", in ways not generally seen in standard English.

The word "Manx", often spelled historically as "Manks" (particularly by natives of the island), means "Mannish" and originates from Old Norse *manskr.

== History ==
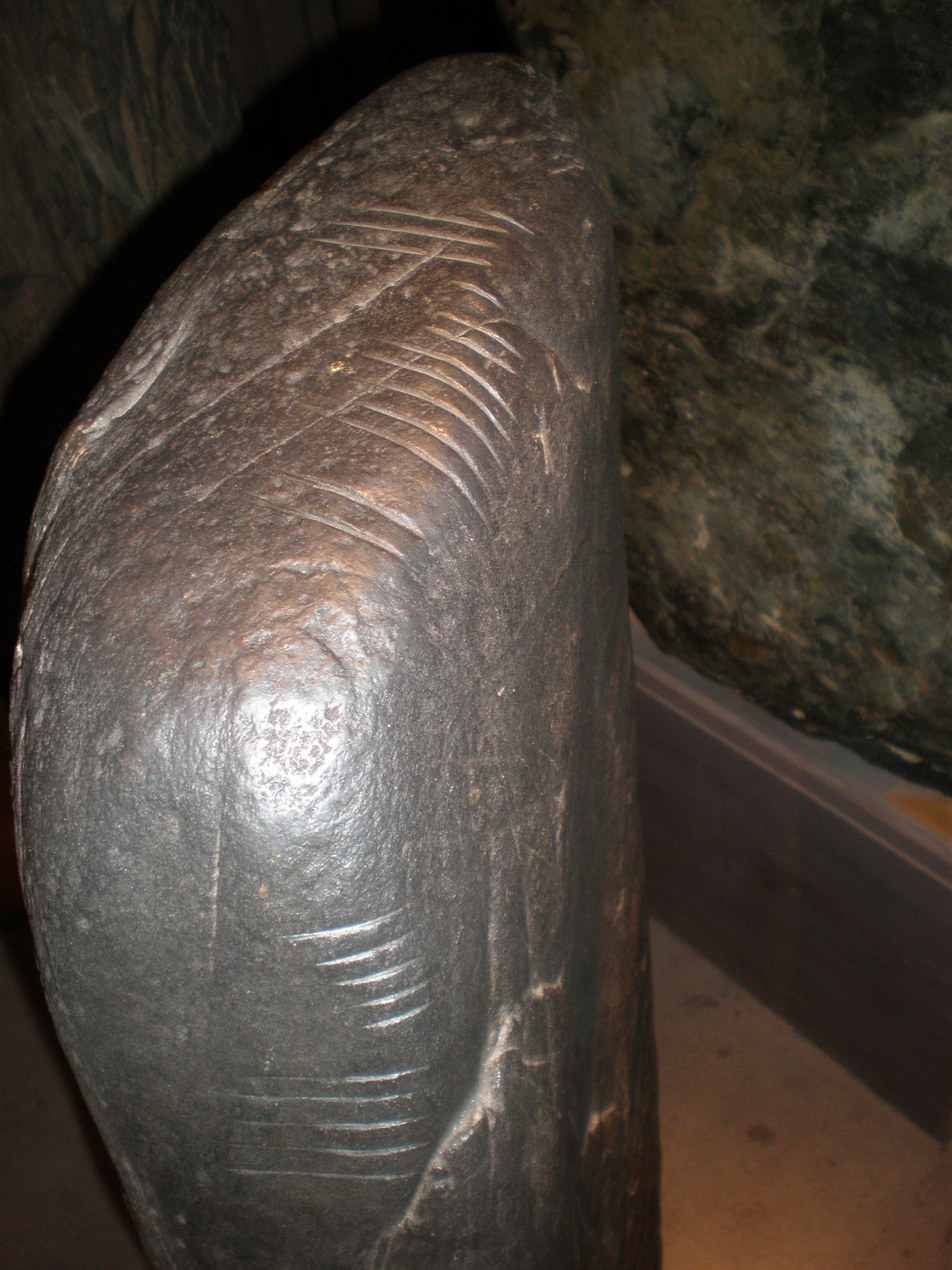
An ogham inscription on a stone in the Manx Museum written in Primitive Irish and which reads DOVAIDONA MAQI DROATA, "Of Dovaido, son of Droata"

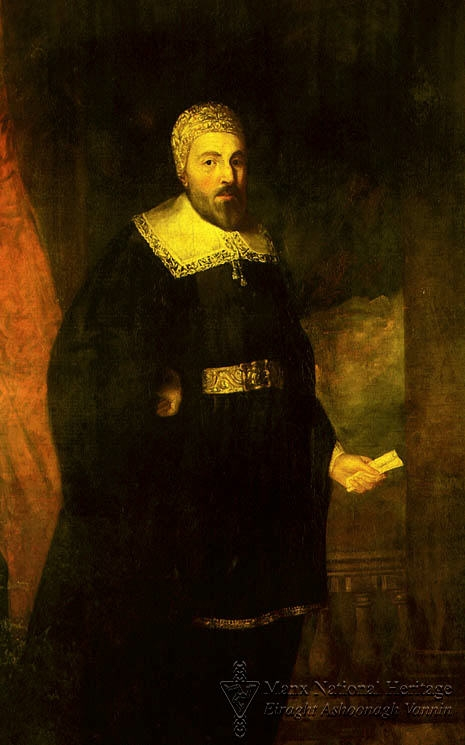
William Christian, better known as Illiam Dhone (Brown-haired William)

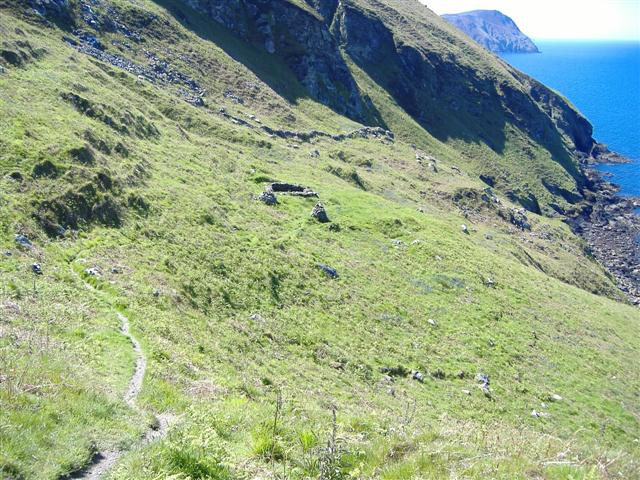
Lag ny Keeilley ("Hollow of the Church") on Cronk ny Arrey Laa ("Hill of the Day Watch"). The Manx language has had a substantial influence on the island's toponymy and nomenclature.

Manx is a Goidelic language, closely related to Irish and Scottish Gaelic. On the whole it is partially mutually intelligible with these, and native speakers of one find it easy to gain passive, and even spoken, competency in the other two.

It has been suggested that a little-documented Brythonic language, related to modern Welsh, Cornish and Breton, may have been spoken on the Isle of Man before the arrival of Christian missionaries from Ireland in the early Middle Ages. However, there is little surviving evidence about the language spoken on the island at that time.

Manx (like Irish and Scottish Gaelic) is descended from Primitive Irish. The island either lends its name to or takes its name from Manannán, the Brythonic and Gaelic sea god who is said in myth to have once ruled the island. Primitive Irish is first attested in Ogham inscriptions from the 4th century AD. These writings have been found throughout Ireland and the west coast of Great Britain. Primitive Irish transitioned into Old Irish through the 5th century. Old Irish, dating from the 6th century, used the Latin script and is attested mainly in marginalia to Latin manuscripts, but there are no extant examples from the Isle of Man.

Latin was used for ecclesiastical records from the establishment of Christianity in the Isle of Man in the 5th century AD. Many words concerning religion, writing and record keeping entered Manx at this time.

The Isle of Man was conquered by Norse Vikings in the 9th century. Though there is some evidence in the form of runic inscriptions that Norse was used by some of these settlers, the Vikings who settled around the Irish Sea and West Coast of Scotland soon became Gaelic-speaking Norse–Gaels. During the 9th century AD, the Gaelic of the inhabitants of the Isle of Man, like those of Scotland and the North of Ireland, may have been significantly influenced by Norse speakers. While Norse had very little impact on the Manx language overall, a small number of modern place names on the Isle of Man are Norse in origin, e.g. Laxey (Laksaa) and Ramsey (Rhumsaa). Other Norse legacies in Manx include loanwords and personal names.

By the 10th century, it is supposed that Middle Irish had emerged and was spoken throughout Ireland, Scotland and the Isle of Man.

The island came under Scottish rule in 1266, and alternated between Scottish and English rule until finally becoming the feudal possession of the Stanley family in 1405. It is likely that until that point, except for scholarly knowledge of Latin and courtly use of Anglo-Norman, Manx was the only language spoken on the island. Since the establishment of the Stanleys on the Isle of Man, first Anglo-Norman and later the English language have been the chief external factors in the development of Manx, until the 20th century, when Manx speakers became able to access Irish and Scottish Gaelic media.

=== 17th to 19th centuries ===
Manx had diverged considerably from the Gaelic languages of Scotland and Ireland between 1400 and 1900. The 17th century Plantation of Ulster, the decline of Irish in Leinster and the extinction of Galloway Gaelic led to the geographic isolation of Manx from other dialects of Gaelic. The development of a separate orthography also led Manx to diverge from Irish and Scottish Gaelic.

In the 17th century, some university students left the Isle of Man to attend school in England. At the same time, teaching in English was required in schools founded by governor Isaac Barrow. Barrow also promoted the use of English in churches; he considered that it was a superior language for reading the Bible; however, because most ministers were monolingual Manx speakers, his views had little practical impact.

Thomas Wilson began his tenure as Bishop of Mann in 1698 and was succeeded by Mark Hildesley. Both men held positive views of Manx; Wilson was the first person to publish a book in Manx, a translation of The Principles and Duties of Christianity (Coyrle Sodjey), and Hildesley successfully promoted the use of Manx as the language of instruction in schools. The New Testament was first published in Manx in 1767. In the late 18th century, nearly every school was teaching in English. This decline continued into the 19th century, as English gradually became the primary language spoken on the Isle of Man.

In 1848, J. G. Cumming wrote, "there are ... few persons (perhaps none of the young) who speak no English." Henry Jenner estimated in 1874 that about 30% of the population habitually spoke Manx (12,340 out of a population of 41,084). According to official census figures, 9.1% of the population claimed to speak Manx in 1901; in 1921 the percentage was only 1.1%. Since the language was used by so few people, it had low linguistic "prestige", and parents tended not to teach Manx to their children, thinking it would be useless to them compared with English.

According to Brian Stowell, "In the 1860s there were thousands of Manx people who couldn't speak English, but barely a century later it was considered to be so backwards to speak the language that there were stories of Manx speakers getting stones thrown at them in the towns."

=== Revival ===
Following the decline in the use of Manx during the 19th century, Yn Çheshaght Ghailckagh (The Manx Language Society) was founded in 1899. By the mid-20th century, only a few elderly native speakers remained (the last of them, Ned Maddrell, died 27 December 1974), but by then a scholarly revival had begun and a few people had started teaching it in schools. The Manx Language Unit was formed in 1992, consisting of three members and headed by Manx Language Officer Brian Stowell, a language activist and fluent speaker, "which was put in charge of all aspects of Manx language teaching and accreditation in schools." This led to an increased interest in studying the Manx language and encouraged a renewed sense of ethnic identity. The revival of Manx was aided by the recording work done in the 20th century by researchers. Most notably, the Irish Folklore Commission was sent in with recording equipment in 1948 by Éamon de Valera. Also important in preserving the Manx language was work conducted by the late Brian Stowell, who is considered personally responsible for the current revival of the Manx language. The Manx Language Strategy was released in 2017, outlining a five-year plan for the language's continued revitalisation. Culture Vannin employs a Manx Language Development Officer (Manx: Yn Greinneyder) to encourage and facilitate the use of the language.

In 2009, UNESCO's Atlas of the World's Languages in Danger declared Manx an extinct language, despite the presence of hundreds of speakers on the Isle of Man. Historian and linguist Jennifer Kewley Draskau reacted to this declaration, stating "Unesco ought to know better than to declare Manx a dead language. There are hundreds of speakers of Manx and while people are able to have productive conversations in the language then it is very much alive and well." Since then, UNESCO's classification of the language has changed to "critically endangered".

In the 2011 census, 1,823 out of 80,398 Isle of Man residents, or 2.27% of the population, claimed to have knowledge of Manx, an increase of 134 people from the 2001 census. These individuals were spread roughly uniformly over the island: in Douglas 566 people professed an ability to speak, read or write Manx; 179 in Peel, 146 in Onchan, and 149 in Ramsey.

Traditional Manx given names have experienced a marked resurgence on the island, especially Moirrey and Voirrey (Mary), Illiam (William), Orry (from the Manx king Godred Crovan of Norse origin), Breeshey/Breesha (Bridget), Aalish/Ealish (Alice), Juan (Jack), Ean (John), Joney (Joan), Fenella (Fionnuala), Pherick (Patrick) and Freya (from the Norse goddess) remain popular.

=== Estimated number of speakers by year ===
Raw data
Isle of Man population
Manx speakers

Year	Manx speakers		Isle of Man population	Ref.
Year	Total	Of Manx population	Isle of Man population	Ref.
1874	16,200	30%	54,000 (1871)	
1901	4,419	8.07%	54,752	
1911	2,382	4.58%	52,016	
1921	915	1.52%	60,284	
1931	529	1.07%	49,308	
1951	355	0.64%	50,253	
1961	165	0.34%	48,133	
1971	284	0.52%	54,481	
1974	Last native speaker dies			
1991	643	0.90%	71,267	
2001	1,500	1.95%	78,266	
2011	1,650	1.97%	84,497	
2015	1,800	2%	88,000	
2021	2,223	2.64%	84,069	

== Status ==
Manx is not officially recognised by any national or regional government, although its contribution to Manx culture and tradition is acknowledged by some governmental and non-governmental bodies.

The Standing Orders of the House of Keys provide that: "The proceedings of the House shall be in English; but if a Member at any point pronounces a customary term or sentence in Manx Gaelic or any other language, the Speaker may call upon the Member for a translation." An example was at the sitting on 12 February 2019, when an MHK used the expression boghtnid, stated to mean "nonsense".

Manx is used in the annual Tynwald ceremony and Manx words are used in official Tynwald publications.

For the purpose of strengthening its contribution to local culture and community, Manx is recognised under the European Charter for Regional or Minority Languages and in the framework of the British-Irish Council.

The Isle of Man comprised the one site for the Manx language in the Atlas Linguarum Europae, a project that compared dialects and languages across all countries in Europe.

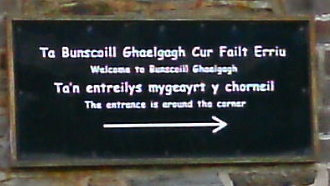
Sign at the Bunscoill Ghaelgagh at St John's

Manx is taught as a second language at all of the island's primary and secondary schools. The lessons are optional and instruction is provided by the Department of Education's Manx Language Team which teach up to A Level standard.

The Bunscoill Ghaelgagh, a primary school at St John's, has 67 children, as of September 2016, who receive nearly all of their education through the medium of the language. Children who have attended the school have the opportunity to receive some of their secondary education through the language at Queen Elizabeth II High School in Peel.

The playgroup organisation Mooinjer Veggey, which operates the Bunscoill Ghaelgagh, runs a series of preschool groups that introduce the language.

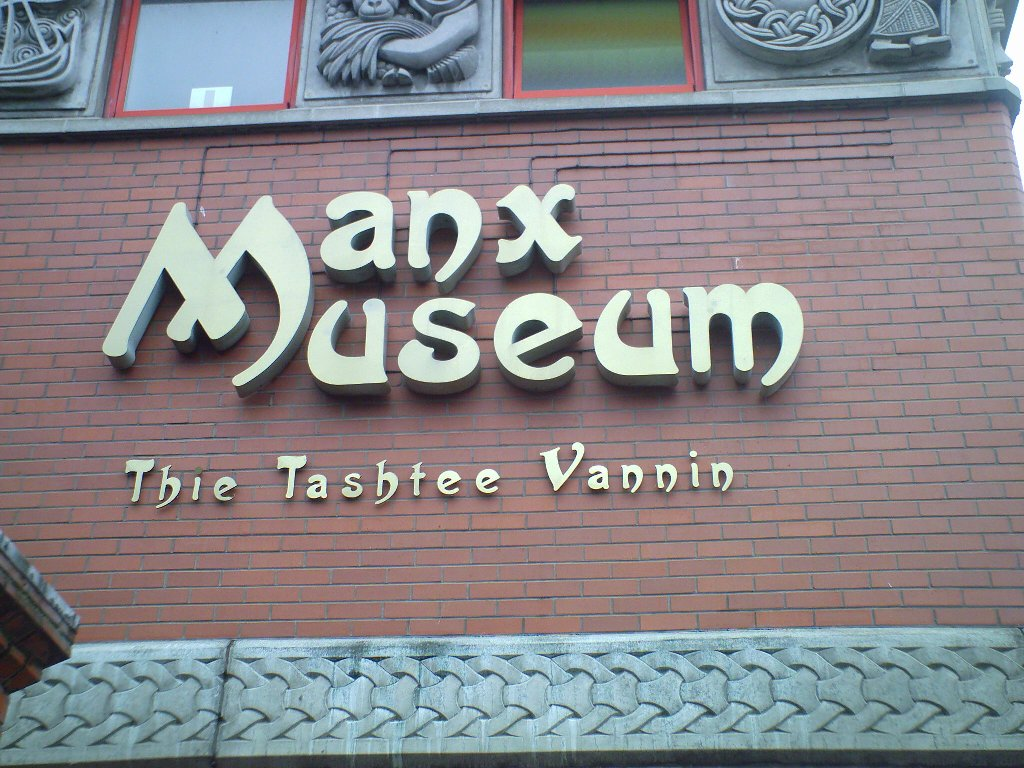
Use of Manx on the national museum, underneath the English

Bilingual road, street, village and town boundary signs are common throughout the Isle of Man. All other road signs are in English only.

Business signage in Manx is gradually being introduced but is not mandated by law; however, the 1985 Tynwald Report on the use of Manx states that signage should be bilingual except where a Manx phrase is the norm.

== Classification ==
Manx is one of the three daughter languages of Old Irish (via Middle Irish), the other two being Irish and Scottish Gaelic. It shares a number of developments in phonology, vocabulary and grammar with its sisters (in some cases only with certain dialects) and shows a number of unique changes. There are two attested historical dialects of Manx, Northern Manx and Southern Manx.

=== Similarities to and differences from Irish and Scottish Gaelic ===
Manx and Scottish Gaelic share the partial loss of phonemic palatalisation of labial consonants; while in Irish velarised consonants /pˠ bˠ fˠ w mˠ/ contrast phonemically with palatalised /pʲ bʲ fʲ vʲ mʲ/. A consequence of this phonemic merger is that Middle Irish unstressed word-final [əβʲ] (-⟨(a)ibh, (a)imh⟩ in Irish and Gaelic) has merged with [əβ] (-⟨(e)abh, (e)amh⟩ in Irish and Gaelic), in Manx; both have become [u] (-⟨oo, u(e)⟩), e.g. shassoo "to stand" (Irish seasamh), credjue "religion" (Irish creideamh), nealloo "fainting" (Early Modern Irish i néalaibh, lit. in clouds), and erriu "on you (pl.)" (Irish oraibh).

Medial and final *⟨bh, mh⟩ have generally become /u/ and /w/ in Manx, thus shiu 'you pl.' (Irish and Scottish Gaelic sibh; Lewis Gaelic siù), sharroo "bitter" (Scottish searbh /ˈʃɛɾˠɛv/, Irish searbh (Northern/Western) /ʃaɾˠu/, (Southern) /ʃaɾˠəβˠ/), awin "river" (Scottish abhainn /aviɲ/, Irish abhainn (Northern) /oːn̠ʲ/) (Western) /aun̠ʲ/ (Southern) /aunʲ/, laaue "hand" (Scottish làmh /l̪ˠaːvˠ/, Irish lámh (Northern) /l̪ˠæːw/, (Western) /l̪ˠɑːw/, (Southern) /l̪ˠɑːβˠ/), sourey "summer" (Scottish samhradh /saurəɣ/, Irish samhradh (Northern) /sˠauɾˠu/, (Western/Southern) /sˠauɾˠə/). Rare retentions of the older pronunciation of ⟨bh⟩ include Divlyn, Divlin "Dublin", Middle Irish Duibhlind /d̪uβʲlʲin̠ʲː/.

Moreover, similarly to Munster Irish, historical ⟨bh⟩ ([βʲ]) and ⟨mh⟩ (nasalised [βʲ]) tend to be lost word medially or finally in Manx, either with compensatory lengthening or vocalisation as [u] resulting in diphthongisation with the preceding vowel, e.g. geurey "winter" [ˈɡʲeurə, -uːrə] (Irish geimhreadh (Southern) [ˈɟiːɾʲə]) and sleityn "mountains" [ˈsleːdʒən] (Irish sléibhte (Southern) [ˈʃlʲeːtʲə]). Another similarity to Munster Irish is the development of the Old Irish diphthongs [ai oi] before velarised consonants (⟨ao⟩ in Irish and Scottish Gaelic) to [eː], as in seyr "carpenter" [seːr] and keyl "narrow" [keːl] (Irish and Scottish saor and caol).

Like Connacht and Ulster Irish (cf. Irish phonology) and most dialects of Scottish Gaelic, Manx has changed the historical consonant clusters /kn ɡn mn tn/ to /kr ɡr mr tr/, e.g. Middle Irish cnáid "mockery" and mná "women" have become craid and mraane respectively in Manx. The affrication of slender "⟨d, t⟩" sounds is also common to Manx, Northern Irish, and Scottish Gaelic.

Unstressed Middle Irish word-final syllable [iʝ] (-⟨(a)idh, (a)igh⟩) has developed to [iː] (-⟨ee⟩) in Manx, as in kionnee "buy" (cf. Irish ceannaigh) and cullee "apparatus" (cf. Gaelic culaidh), like Northern/Western Irish and Southern dialects Scottish Gaelic (e.g. Arran, Kintyre).

Another property Manx shares with Ulster Irish and some dialects of Scottish Gaelic is that /a/ rather than /ə/ appears in unstressed syllables before /x/ (⟨agh⟩ in Manx), e.g. jeeragh "straight" [ˈdʒiːrax] (Irish díreach), cooinaghtyn "to remember" [ˈkuːnʲaxt̪ən] (Scottish Gaelic cuimhneachd).

Like Southern and Western Irish and Northern Scottish Gaelic, but unlike the geographically closer varieties of Ulster Irish and Arran and Kintyre Gaelic, Manx shows vowel lengthening or diphthongisation before the Old Irish fortis and lenis sonorants, e.g. cloan "children" [klɔːn], dhone "brown" [d̪oːn] and eeym "butter" [iːᵇm] correspond to Irish/Scottish Gaelic clann, donn, and im respectively, which have long vowels or diphthongs in Western and Southern Irish and in the Scottish Gaelic dialects of the Outer Hebrides and Skye, thus Western Irish [klˠɑːn̪ˠ], Southern Irish/Northern Scottish [kl̪ˠaun̪ˠ], [d̪ˠaun̪ˠ]/[d̪ˠoun̪ˠ], [iːm]/[ɤim]), but short vowels and 'long' consonants in Ulster Irish, Arran, and Kintyre, [klˠan̪ːˠ], [d̪ˠon̪ːˠ] and [imʲː].

Another similarity with Southern Irish is the treatment of Middle Irish word-final unstressed [əð] (-⟨(e)adh⟩ in Irish and Scottish Gaelic). In nouns (including verbal nouns), this became [ə] in Manx, as it did in Southern Irish, e.g. caggey "war" [ˈkaːɣə], moylley "to praise" [ˈmɔlə] (cf. Irish cogadh and moladh (Southern Irish) [ˈkɔɡə] and [ˈmˠɔl̪ˠə]). In finite verb forms before full nouns (as opposed to pronouns) [əð] became [ax] in Manx, as in Southern Irish, e.g. voyllagh [ˈvɔlax] "would praise" (cf. Irish mholfadh (Southern Irish) [ˈβˠɔl̪ˠhəx]).

== Dialects ==
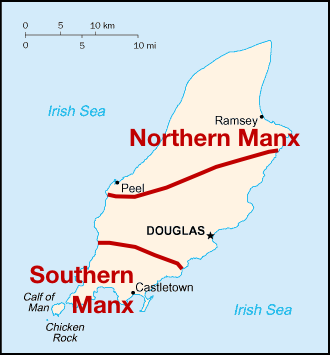
Historical dialect map of Manx (boundaries are approximate)

Linguistic analysis of the last few dozen native speakers reveals a number of dialectal differences between the North and the South of the island. Northern Manx (Manx: Gaelg Hwoaie) was spoken from Maughold in the northeast to Peel on the west coast. Southern Manx was spoken in the sheading of Rushen. It is possible that written Manx represents a 'midlands' dialect of Douglas and surrounding areas.

In Southern Manx, older ⟨á⟩, and in some cases ⟨ó⟩, became [æː]. In Northern Manx the same happened, but ⟨á⟩ sometimes remained [aː] as well, e.g. laa "day" (cf. Irish lá) was [læː] in the South but [læː] or [laː] in the North. Old ⟨ó⟩ is always [æː] in both dialects, e.g. aeg "young" (cf. Irish óg) is [æːɡ] in both dialects. ⟨á, ó⟩ and lengthened ⟨a⟩ before ⟨rt, rd, rg⟩ became /œː/, as in paayrt '"part" /pœːrt/, ard "high" /œːrd/, jiarg "red" /dʒœːrɡ/, argid "money, silver" /œːrɡid/ and aarey "gold gen." /œːrə/.

In Northern Manx, older ⟨(e)a⟩ before ⟨nn⟩ in the same syllable is diphthongized, while in Southern Manx it is lengthened but remains a monophthong, e.g. kione "head" (cf. Irish ceann) is [kʲaun] in the North but [kʲoːn] in the South.

Words with ⟨ua⟩, and in some cases ⟨ao⟩, in Irish and Scottish are spelled with ⟨eay⟩ in Manx. In Northern Manx, this sound was [iː], while in Southern Manx it was [ɯː], [uː], or [yː], e.g. geay "wind" (cf. Irish gaoth) is [ɡiː] in the north and [ɡɯː] in the South, while geayl "coal" (cf. Irish gual) is [ɡiːl] in the North and [ɡyːl], [ɡɯːl], or [ɡuːl] in the South.

In both the North and the South, there is a tendency to insert a short [d] before a word-final [n] in monosyllabic words, as in [sleᵈn] for slane "whole" and [beᵈn] for ben "woman". This is known as pre-occlusion. In Southern Manx, however, there is also pre-occlusion of [d] before [l] and of [ɡ] before [ŋ], as in [ʃuːᵈl] for shooyl "walking" and [lɔᶢŋ] for lhong "ship". These forms are generally pronounced without pre-occlusion in the North. Pre-occlusion of [b] before [m], on the other hand, is more common in the North, as in trome "heavy", which is [t̪roᵇm] in the North but [t̪roː(ᵇ)m] in the South. This feature is also found in Cornish.

Southern Manx tended to lose word-initial [ɡ] before [lʲ], which was usually preserved in the North, e.g. glion "glen" and glioon "knee" are [lʲɔᵈn] and [lʲuːᵈn] in the South but [ɡlʲɔᵈn] and [ɡlʲuːn] in the North.

In modern times, the small size of the island and the improvement in communications precludes any regional dialect variations.

== Media ==
Two weekly programmes in Manx are available on medium wave on Manx Radio: Traa dy liooar on Monday and Jamys Jeheiney on Friday. The news in Manx is available online from Manx Radio, who have three other weekly programmes that use the language: Clare ny Gael; Shiaght Laa and Moghrey Jedoonee. Several news readers on Manx Radio also use a good deal of incidental Manx.

The Isle of Man Examiner has a monthly bilingual column in Manx.

The first film to be made in Manx, 22-minute-long Ny Kirree fo Niaghtey "The Sheep Under the Snow", premiered in 1983 and was entered for the 5th Celtic Film and Television Festival in Cardiff in 1984. It was directed by Shorys Y Creayrie (George Broderick) for Foillan Films of Laxey, and is about the background to an early 18th-century folk song. In 2013, a short film, Solace in Wicca, was produced with financial assistance from Culture Vannin, CinemaNX and Isle of Man Film. A series of short cartoons about the life of Cú Chulainn which was produced by BBC Northern Ireland is available as are a series of cartoons on Manx mythology. Most significant is a 13-part DVD series Manx translation of the award-winning series Friends and Heroes.

=== Literature ===
Manx never had a large number of speakers, so it would not have been practical to mass-produce written literature. However, a body of oral literature did exist. The "Fianna" tales and others like them are known, including the Manx ballad Fin as Oshin, commemorating Finn MacCumhail and Oisín. With the coming of Protestantism, Manx spoken tales slowly disappeared, while a tradition of carvals, Christian ballads, developed with religious sanction. Even so, Bishop Mark Hildesley, after his gardener overheard him discussing the Ossian poems of James Macpherson and admitted to known of Fionn and Oisin, the Bishop collected from the local oral tradition multiple lays in Manx from the Fenian Cycle of Celtic Mythology, which were accordingly preserved for the future.

There is no record of literature written distinctively in Manx before the Reformation. By that time, any presumed literary link with Ireland and Scotland, such as through Irish-trained priests, had been lost. The first published literature in Manx was The Principles and Duties of Christianity (Coyrie Sodjey), translated by Bishop of Sodor and Man Thomas Wilson.

The Book of Common Prayer was translated by John Phillips, the Welsh-born Anglican Bishop of Sodor and Man from 1605 to 1633. The early Manx script has some similarities with orthographical systems found occasionally in Scotland and in Ireland for the transliteration of Gaelic, such as the Book of the Dean of Lismore, as well as some extensive texts based on English and Scottish English orthographical practices of the time. Little secular Manx literature has been preserved.

The New Testament was first published in 1767. When the Anglican church authorities started to produce written literature in the Manx language in the 18th century, the system developed by John Philips was further "anglicised"; the one feature retained from Welsh orthography was the use of ⟨y⟩ to represent /ə/ (e.g. cabbyl [kaːβəl] "horse" and cooney [kuːnə] "help") as well as /ɪ/ (e.g. fys [fɪz] "knowledge"), though it is also used to represent [j], (e.g. y Yuan [ə juːan] "John" (vocative), yeeast [jiːəst] "fish").

Other works produced in the 18th and 19th centuries include catechisms, hymn books and religious tracts. A translation of Paradise Lost was made by Rev. Thomas Christian of Marown in 1796.

A considerable amount of secular literature has been produced in the 20th and 21st centuries as part of the language revival. In 2006, the first full-length novel in Manx, Dunveryssyn yn Tooder-Folley ("The Vampire Murders") was published by Brian Stowell, after being serialised in the press. There is an increasing amount of literature available in the language, and recent publications include Manx versions of The Gruffalo and The Gruffalo's Child.

Antoine de Saint-Exupéry's The Little Prince was translated into Manx by Rob Teare in 2019.

== Manx and Christianity ==
=== The Manx Bible ===
In the time of Bishop Wilson, it had been a constant source of complaint among the Manx clergy that they were the only church in Christendom that had no version of the Bible in the vulgar tongue. Wilson set to work to remedy the defect, and, with the assistance of some of his clergy, managed to get some of the Bible translated, and the Gospel of St. Matthew printed. Bishop Hildesley, his successor, with the help of the whole body of Manx clergy, completed the work, and in 1775 the whole Bible was printed.

The Bible was first produced in Manx by a group of Anglican clergymen on the island. The Gospel of Matthew was printed in 1748. The Gospel and Conaant Noa nyn Jiarn as Saualtagh Yeesey Creest were produced in 1763 and 1767, respectively, by the Society for the Propagation of Christian Knowledge (SPCK). In 1772 the Old Testament was printed, together with the Wisdom and Sirach (Ecclesiasticus) from the Apocrypha.

Yn Vible Casherick "The Holy Bible" of the Old and New Testaments was published as one book by the SPCK in 1775, effectively fixing the modern orthography of Manx, which has changed little since. Jenner claims that some bowdlerisation had occurred in the translation, e.g. the occupation of Rahab the prostitute is rendered as ben-oast "a hostess, female inn-keeper." The bicentenary was celebrated in 1975 and included a set of stamps from the Isle of Man Post Office.

There was a translation of the Psalmyn Ghavid ("Psalms of David") in metre in Manx by the Rev John Clague, vicar of Rushen, which was printed with the Book of Common Prayer of 1768. Bishop Hildesley required that these Metrical Psalms were to be sung in churches. These were reprinted by Yn Çheshaght Ghailckagh in 1905.

The British and Foreign Bible Society (BFBS) published the Conaant Noa "New Testament" in 1810 and reprinted it in 1824. Yn Vible Casherick "The Holy Bible" of the Old Testament and New Testament (without the two books of the Apocrypha) was first printed as a whole in 1819. BFBS last printed anything on paper in Manx in 1936 when it reprinted Noo Ean "the Gospel of St John"; this was reprinted by Yn Çheshaght Ghailckagh in 1968. The Manx Bible was republished by Shearwater Press in July 1979 as Bible Chasherick yn Lught Thie (Manx Family Bible), which was a reproduction of the BFBS 1819 Bible.

Since 2014 the BFBS 1936 Manx Gospel of John has been available online on YouVersion and Bibles.org.

=== Church ===
Manx has not been used in Mass since the late 19th century, though Yn Çheshaght Ghailckagh holds an annual Christmas service on the island.

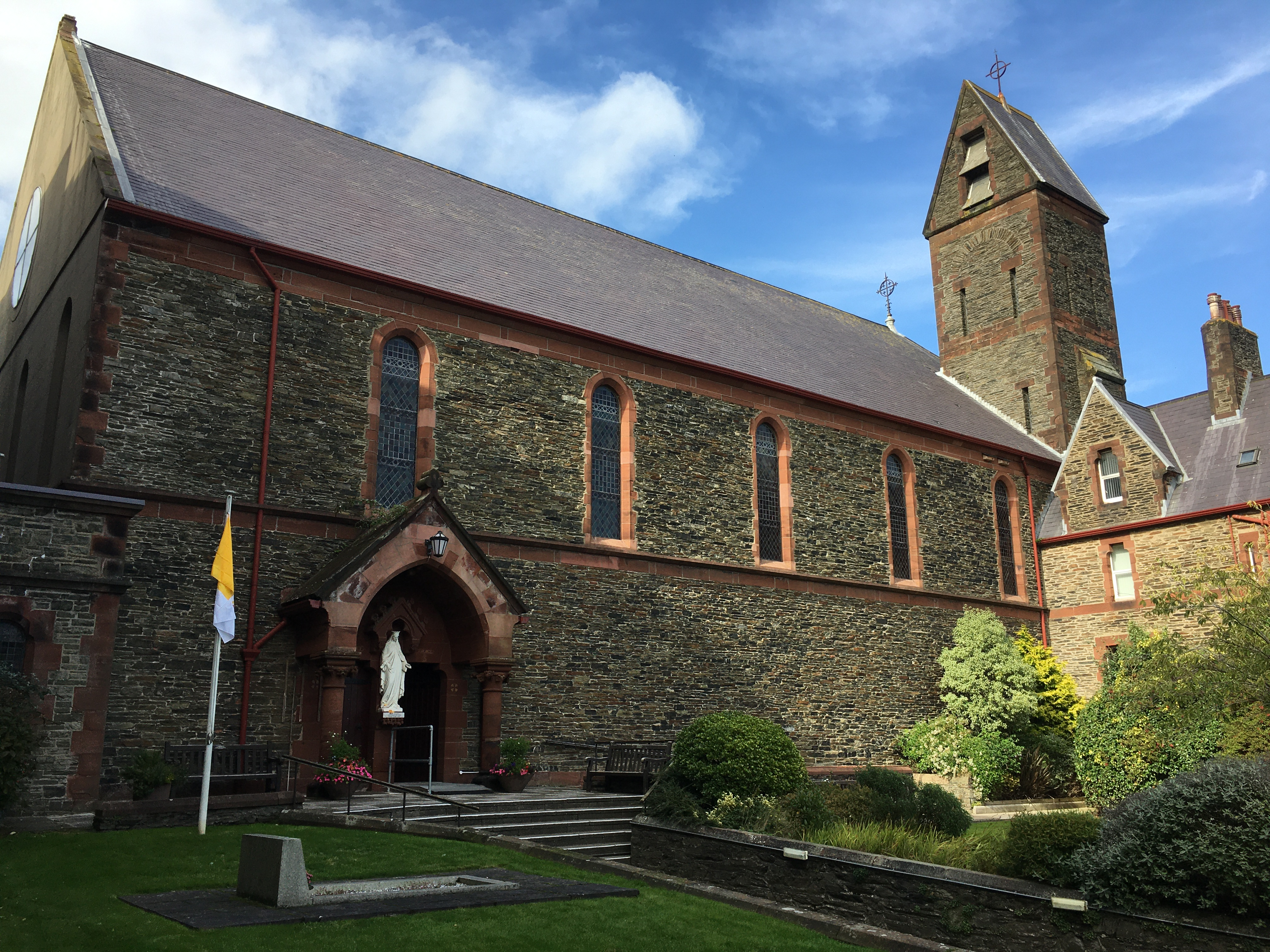
St. Mary of the Isle Cathedral, Douglas, Isle of Man

In a move towards the Catholic Church in the Isle of Man having a Bishop of its own, in September 2023 St Mary of the Isle Church in Douglas was granted Co-Cathedral status by Pope Francis. During the Mass of dedication by Malcolm McMahon, the Archbishop of Liverpool, the Lord's Prayer was recited in Manx and the Manx National Anthem was also performed.

== Phonology ==
=== Stress ===
Stress generally falls on the first syllable of a word in Manx, but in many cases, stress is attracted to a long vowel in the second syllable. Examples include:

- buggane /bəˈɣæːn/ "sprite"
- tarroogh /t̪aˈruːx/ "busy"
- reeoil /riːˈoːl/ "royal"
- vondeish /vonˈd̪eːʃ/ "advantage"

=== Consonants ===
The consonant phoneme inventory of Manx:

	Labial		Dental		Alveolar		Post- alveolar		Palatal	Palato- velar		Velar		Glottal
Plosive	p	b	t̪	d̪	(t̠)	(d̠)	tʲ	dʲ		kʲ	ɡʲ	k	ɡ	
Fricative	f	v			s		ʃ			ç		x	ɣ	h
Nasal		m		n		(n̠)		nʲ			ŋʲ		ŋ	
Trill						r		rʲ						
Lateral				l		(l̠)		lʲ						
Semivowel									j				w	

The voiceless plosives are aspirated. The dental, postalveolar and palato-velar plosives /t̪ d̪ tʲ dʲ kʲ ɡʲ/ affricate to [t̪͡θ d̪͡ð t͡ʃ d͡ʒ k͡xʲ ɡ͡ɣʲ] in many contexts.

Manx has an optional process of lenition of plosives between vowels, where voiced plosives and voiceless fricatives become voiced fricatives and voiceless plosives become either voiced plosives or voiced fricatives. This process introduces the allophones [β ð z ʒ]. The voiced fricative [ʒ] may be further lenited to [j], and [ɣ] may disappear altogether. Examples include:

Voiceless plosive to voiced plosive:

- /t̪/ > [d̪]: brattag [ˈbrad̪aɡ] "flag, rag"
- /k/ > [ɡ]: peccah [ˈpɛɡə] "sin"

Voiceless plosive to voiced fricative:

- /p/ > [v]: cappan [ˈkavan] "cup"
- /t̪/ > [ð]: baatey [ˈbɛːðə] "boat"
- /k/ > [ɣ]: feeackle [ˈfiːɣəl] "tooth"

Voiced plosive to voiced fricative:

- /b/ > [v]: cabbyl [ˈkaːvəl] "horse"
- /d̪/ > [ð]: eddin [ˈɛðənʲ] "face"
- /dʲ/ > [ʒ]: padjer [ˈpaːʒər] "prayer"
- /dʲ/ > [ʒ] > [j]: maidjey [ˈmaːʒə, -jə] "stick"
- /ɡ/ > [ɣ]: ruggit [ˈroɣət] "born"

Voiceless fricative to voiced fricative:

- /s/ > [ð] or [z]: poosit [ˈpuːðitʲ/ˈpuːzitʲ] "married"
- /s/ > [ð]: shassoo [ˈʃaːðu] "stand"
- /ʃ/ > [ʒ]: aashagh [ˈɛːʒax] "easy"
- /ʃ/ > [ʒ] > [j]: toshiaght [ˈt̪ɔʒax, -jax] "beginning"
- /x/ > [ɣ]: beaghey [ˈbeːɣə] "live"
- /x/ > [ɣ] > ∅: shaghey [ʃaː] "past"

Another optional process is pre-occlusion, the insertion of a very short plosive before a sonorant consonant. In Manx, this applies to stressed monosyllabic words. The inserted consonant is homorganic with the following sonorant, which means it has the same place of articulation. Long vowels are often shortened before pre-occluded sounds. Examples include:

- /m/ > [ᵇm]: trome /t̪roːm/ > [t̪roᵇm] "heavy"
- /n/ > [ᵈn]: kione /kʲoːn/ > [kʲoᵈn] "head"
- /nʲ/ > [ᵈnʲ]: ein /eːnʲ/ > [eːᵈnʲ], [eᵈnʲ] "birds"
- /ŋ/ > [ᶢŋ]: lhong /loŋ/ > [loᶢŋ] "ship"
- /l/ > [ᵈl]: shooyll /ʃuːl/ > [ʃuːᵈl] "walking"

The trill /r/ is realised as a one- or two-contact flap [ɾ] at the beginning of syllable, and as a stronger trill [r] when preceded by another consonant in the same syllable. At the end of a syllable, /r/ can be pronounced either as a strong trill [r] or, more frequently, as a weak fricative [ɹ̝], which may vocalise to a nonsyllabic [ə̯] or disappear altogether. This vocalisation may be due to the influence of Manx English, which is non-rhotic. Examples of the pronunciation of /r/ include:

- ribbey "snare" [ˈɾibə]
- arran "bread" [ˈaɾan]
- mooar "big" [muːr], [muːɹ̝], [muːə̯], [muː]

=== Vowels ===
The vowel phoneme inventory of Manx:

	Front		Central		Back	
	Short	Long	Short	Long	Short	Long
Close	i	iː			u	uː
Mid	e	eː	ə	øː	o	oː
Open	æ	æː	a	aː	ɔ	ɔː

The status of [æ] and [æː] as separate phonemes is debatable, but is suggested by the allophony of certain words such as ta "is", mraane "women", and so on. An alternative analysis is that Manx has the following system, where the vowels /a/ and /aː/ have allophones ranging from [ɛ]/[ɛː] through [æ]/[æː] to [a]/[aː]. As with Irish and Scottish Gaelic, there is a large amount of vowel allophony, such as that of /a/, /aː/. This depends mainly on the 'broad' and 'slender' status of the neighbouring consonants:

Manx vowel phonemes and their allophones
Phoneme	"Slender"	"Broad"
/i/, /iː/	[i], [iː]	[ɪ], [ɪː]
/e/, /eː/	[e]/[eː]	[ɛ]/[ɛː]
/a/, /aː/	[ɛ~æ]/[ɛː~æː]	[a]/[aː]/[øː]
/ə/	[ɨ]	[ə]
/əi/ (Middle Gaelic)	[iː]	[ɛː], [ɯː], [ɪː]
/o/, /oː/	[o], [oː]	[ɔ], [ɔː]
/u/, /uː/	[u], [uː]	[ø~ʊ], [uː]
/uə/ (Middle Gaelic)	[iː], [yː]	[ɪː], [ɯː], [uː]

When stressed, /ə/ is realised as [ø].

Manx has a large inventory of diphthongs and triphthongs, some of which tended to merge or monophthongise in Late Manx.

Centring diphthongs
	Front	Central	Back
High	iә	ɨә	uə

Fronting diphthongs and triphthongs
	Front	Central	Back
High		(ɨəi)	ui uːi uəi
Mid-high	ei eːi	əi əːi	oːi
Mid-low	ɛːi		
Low		ai	

Backing diphthongs and triphthongs
	Front	Central	Back
High	iu iːu iəu		
Mid-high	eu eːu	əu	oːu
Mid-low	ɛːu		
Low		au	

== Orthography ==
Manx orthography is based on Elizabethan English, and to a lesser extent Middle Welsh, developed by people who had an education in English (and Welsh until the 16th century). The result is an inconsistent and only partly phonemic spelling system, similar to English orthography and completely incomprehensible to readers of Irish and Scottish Gaelic. This is because both Irish and Scottish Gaelic use spelling systems derived from Classical Gaelic, the common literary language of Man, Ireland, and Scotland until the Bardic schools closed down in the 17th century, which makes them very etymological. Both Irish and Scottish Gaelic use only 18 letters to represent around 50 phonemes. While Manx uses 24 letters (the ISO basic Latin alphabet, excluding ⟨x⟩ and ⟨z⟩), covering a similar range of phonemes, all three make use of many digraphs and trigraphs. In 1932, Celticist T. F. O'Rahilly expressed the opinion that Manx orthography is inadequate, as it is neither traditional nor phonetic. Therefore, if a form of Classical Gaelic orthography adapted to Manx had survived or if one based on the reforms of Theobald Stapleton were to be developed and introduced, the very close relationship between Manx, Irish, and Scottish Gaelic would be obvious to readers at first sight and Manx would be much easier for other Gaels to read and understand.

However, evidence of Gaelic type ever having been used on the island has not been found.

=== Spelling to sound correspondences ===
Vowels
Letter(s)		Phoneme(s)	Examples
a	stressed	/a/ /aː/	Ghaelgagh, cooinaghtyn padjer, cabbyl
a	unstressed	/ə/ /i/ /a/	ardnieu, bodjal collaneyn duillag
a...e, ia...e		/eː/	slane, buggane, kiare
aa, aa...e		/ɛː/ /øː/ /eːa/ /eː/ /aː/ (north)	baatey, aashagh faarkey jaagh blaa, aane
aai		/ɛi/	faaie
ae		/i/ /ɪ/ /eː/	Gaelg; Ghaelgagh aeg, aer
aew		/au/	braew
ah		/ə/	peccah
ai, ai...e		/aː/ /ai/ /e/	maidjey aile paitçhey
aiy		/eː/	faiyr
aue		/eːw/	craue, fraue
ay		/eː/	ayr, kay
e	stressed	/e/ /eː/ /ɛ/ /i/	ben, veggey mess peccah, eddin chengey
e	unstressed	/ə/	padjer
ea		/ɛː/	beaghey
eai		/eː/	eairk
eau, ieau		/uː/	slieau
eay		/eː/ /iː/ (north) /ɯː/, /uː/ or /yː/ (south)	eayst, cleaysh geay, keayn
ee		/iː/	kionnee, jees
eea		/iːə/ /iː/ /jiː/	yeeast, keead feeackle, keeagh eeast
eei, eey		/iː/	feeid, dreeym, meeyl
ei		/eː/ /e/ /a/	sleityn, ein queig geinnagh
eih		/ɛː/	jeih
eoie		/øi/	leoie
eu, ieu		/uː/ /eu/	geurey ardnieu
ey	stressed	/eː/	seyr, keyl
ey	unstressed	/ə/	veggey, collaneyn
i	unstressed	/ə/ /i/	eddin, ruggit poosit
ia		/aː/ /a/ /iː/ /iːə/	çhiarn, shiaght toshiaght, sniaghtey grian skian
ie		/aɪ/	mie
io		/ɔ/	glion
io...e		/au/ (north) /oː/ (south)	kione
o, oi		/ɔ/ or /ɑ/ /ɔː/ or /ɑː/ /o/ /oː/ /u/	lhong, toshiaght bodjal, logh, moir vondeish, bolg, bunscoill hoght, reeoil stroin
o...e		/ɔː/ /oː/	dhone trome
oa		/ɔː/ /au/	cloan joan
oh		/ɔ/	shoh
oie		/ei/ or /iː/	oie
oo, ioo, ooh		/uː/	shassoo, cooney, glioon, ooh
ooa, iooa		/uː/	mooar
ooi		/u/	mooinjer, cooinaghtyn
ooy		/uː/	shooyl
oy		/ɔ/	moylley, voyllagh
u, ui, iu	stressed	/ʊ/ /o/ /ø/	bunscoill ruggit, ushag, duillag, fuill lurgey
u, ui, iu	unstressed	/ə/	buggane
ua		/uːa/	y Yuan
ue		/u/	credjue
uy		/ɛi/ or /iː/	nuy
wa		/o/	mwannal
y		/ə/ /i/ /ɪ/ /j/	cabbyl, sleityn yngyn fys y Yuan, yeeast

Consonants
Letter(s)		Phoneme(s)	Examples
b, bb	usually	/b/	bunscoill, ben
b, bb	between vowels	/β/ or /v/	cabbyl
c, cc, ck	usually	/k/	bunscoill, cloan
c, cc, ck	between vowels	/ɡ/ /ɣ/	peccah, gaccan feeackle, crackan
ch		/x/	cha
çh, tçh		/tʃ/	çhiarn, çhengey, paitçhey
d, dd, dh	broad	/d̪/	keead, ardnieu, tedd, dhone
d, dd, dh	slender	/dʲ/ or /dʒ/	feeid
d, dd, dh	broad, between vowels	/ð/	eddin, moddey
f		/f/	fys, feeackle
g, gg	broad	/ɡ/	Gaelg, Ghaelgagh
g, gg	slender	/ɡʲ/	geurey, geinnagh
g, gg	between vowels	/ɣ/	veggey, ruggit
gh	usually	/ɣ/ ∅	Ghaelgagh, beaghey shaghey
gh	finally or before t	/x/	jeeragh, clagh, cooinaghtyn
-ght		/x/	toshiaght, hoght
h		/h/	hoght
j, dj	usually	/dʒ/	mooinjer, jeeragh
j, dj	between vowels	/ʒ/ /j/	padjer maidjey, fedjag
k	broad	/k/	keyl, eairk
k	slender	/kʲ/	kione, kiare
l, ll	broad	/l/	Gaelg, sleityn, moylley
l, ll	slender	/lʲ/	glion, blein, feill, billey
l, ll	finally, in monosyllabic words (S only)	/ᵈl/	shooyl
-le		/əl/	feeackle
lh		/l/	lhong
m, mm	normally	/m/	mooinjer, dreeym, famman
m, mm	finally, in monosyllabic words (N only)	/ᵇm/	eeym, trome
n	broad	/n/	bunscoill, cooinaghtyn, ennym
n	slender	/nʲ/	ardnieu, collaneyn, dooinney, geinnagh
n	finally, in monosyllabic words	/ᵈn/	slane, ben
n	slender, finally, in monosyllabic words	/ᵈnʲ/	ein
ng	usually	/ŋ/ /nʲ/	yngyn chengey
ng	finally, in monosyllabic words (S only)	/ᶢŋ/	lhong
p, pp	usually	/p/	peccah, padjer
p, pp	between vowels	/v/	cappan
qu		/kw/	queig
r, rr	usually	/r/	geurey, jeeragh, ferrishyn
r, rr	finally	[ɹ̝] or [ə̯]	aer, faiyr
s, ss	usually	/s/ /z/	bunscoill, sleityn, cass fys
s, ss	initially before n	/ʃ/	sniaghtey
s, ss	between vowels	/ð/ /z/	shassoo poosit
sh	usually	/ʃ/	shooyl, vondeish
sh	between vowels	/ʒ/ /j/	aashagh, ushag toshiaght
-st		/s/	eayst, eeast
t, tt, th	broad	/t̪/	trome, cooinaghtyn, thalloo
t, tt, th	slender	/tʲ/ or /tʃ/	poosit, ushtey, tuittym
t, tt, th	broad, between vowels	/d̪/ /ð/	brattag baatey
t, tt, th	slender, between vowels	/dʲ/ or /dʒ/	sleityn
v		/v/	veggey, voyllagh
w		/w/	awin

=== Diacritics ===
Manx uses only one diacritic, a cedilla, which is (optionally) used to differentiate between the two phonemes spelled ⟨ch⟩:

- Çhiarn (/ˈt͡ʃaːrn/) "lord", is pronounced with /t͡ʃ/, as in the English "church"
- Chamoo (/xaˈmu/) "nor" or "neither", is pronounced with /x/, as in Scottish English "loch" (/ˈlɒx/) or Irish English "lough" (/ˈlɒx/), a sound commonly represented by ⟨gh⟩ at the ends of words in Manx (and Irish English).

== Grammar ==
=== Morphology ===
==== Initial consonant mutations ====
Like all modern Celtic languages, Manx shows initial consonant mutations, processes whereby the initial consonant of a word is altered according to its morphological and/or syntactic environment. Manx has two mutations: lenition and eclipsis, found on nouns and verbs in a variety of environments; adjectives can undergo lenition but not eclipsis. In the late spoken language of the 20th century the system was breaking down, with speakers often failing to use mutation in environments where it was called for, and occasionally using it in environments where it was not called for.

Initial consonant mutations in Manx
Unmutated		Lenition		Eclipsis	
Sp.	IPA	Sp.	IPA	Sp.	IPA
p	/p/	ph	/f/	b	/b/
t(h)	/t̪/	h	/h/, /x/	d(h)	/d̪/
çh	/tʲ~tɕ/	h	/h/, /xʲ/	j	/dʲ/
c, k	/kʲ/	ch	/xʲ/	g	/ɡʲ/
c, k qu	/k/ /kw/	ch wh	/x/, /h/ /hw/	g gu	/ɡ/
b bw	/b/ /bw/	b w	/v/ /w/	m mw	/m/ /mw/
d(h)	/d̪/	gh	/ɣ/, /w/	n	/n/
j	/dʲ~dʑ/	gh, y	/ɣʲ/, /j/	n	/nʲ/
g	/ɡʲ/	gh, y	/ɣʲ/, /j/	ng	/ŋ/?
m mw	/m/ /mw/	v w	/v/ /w/	—N/a	
f fw	/f/ /fw/	∅ wh	∅ /hw/	v w	/v/ /w/
s sl sn	/s/ /sl/ /snʲ/	h l n	/h/ /l/ /nʲ/	—N/a	
sh	/ʃ/	h	/h/, /xʲ/	—N/a	

In the corpus of the late spoken language, there is also one example of the eclipsis (nasalization) of /ɡ/: the sentence Ta mee er ngeddyn yn eayn ("I have found the lamb"), where ⟨ng⟩ is pronounced /n/. However, this is probably a mis-transcription; the verbal noun in this case is not geddyn "get, fetch", but rather feddyn "find".

==== Nouns ====
Manx nouns display gender, number and sometimes case, for instance, for feminine cass "foot".

	Singular	Plural
Nominative	cass	cassyn
Vocative	chass	chassyn
Genitive	coshey	cassyn

==== Pronouns ====
In addition to regular forms, personal pronouns also have emphatic versions.

Manx personal pronouns
			Regular	Emphatic
Singular	1st person		mee	mish
Singular	2nd person		oo	uss
Singular	3rd person	masculine	eh	eshyn
Singular	3rd person	feminine	ee	ish
Plural	1st person		shin	shinyn
Plural	2nd person		shiu	shiuish
Plural	3rd person		ad	adsyn

==== Verbs ====
Manx verbs generally form their finite forms by means of periphrasis: inflected forms of the auxiliary verbs ve "to be" or jannoo "to do" are combined with the verbal noun of the main verb. Only the future, conditional, preterite, and imperative can be formed directly by inflecting the main verb, but even in these tenses, the periphrastic formation is more common in Late Spoken Manx.

Manx finite verb forms
Tense	Periphrastic form (literal translation)	Inflected form	Gloss
Present	ta mee tilgey (I am throwing)	–	I throw
Imperfect	va mee tilgey (I was throwing)	–	I was throwing
Perfect	ta mee er jilgey (I am after throwing)	–	I have thrown
Pluperfect	va mee er jilgey (I was after throwing)	–	I had thrown
Preterite	ren mee tilgey (I did throwing)	hilg mee	I threw
Future	neeym tilgey (I will do throwing)	tilgym	I will throw
Conditional	yinnin tilgey (I would do throwing)	hilgin	I would throw
Imperative	jean tilgey (Do throwing!)	tilg	Throw!
Past participle	–	tilgit	thrown

The fully inflected forms of the regular verb tilgey "to throw" are as follows. In addition to the forms below, a past participle may be formed using -it: tilgit "thrown".

Inflection of a regular Manx verb
Tense	Independent	Dependent	Relative
Preterite	hilg	(same as independent)	
Future	tilgym^{[1]}, tilgmayd^{[2]}, tilgee^{[3]}	dilgym^{[1]}, dilgmayd^{[2]}, dilgee^{[3]}	tilgys
Conditional	tilgin^{[1]}, tilgagh^{[3]}	dilgin^{[1]}, dilgagh^{[3]}	
Imperative	tilg^{[4]}, tilg-jee^{[5]}	(same as independent)	

1. First person singular, making the use of a following subject pronoun redundant

2. First person plural, making the use of a following subject pronoun redundant

3. Used with all other persons, meaning an accompanying subject must be stated, e.g. tilgee eh "he will throw", tilgee ad "they will throw"

4. Singular subject.

5. Plural subject.

There are a few peculiarities when a verb begins with a vowel, i.e. the addition of d' in the preterite and n' in the future and conditional dependent. Below is the conjugation of aase "to grow".

There is a small number of irregular verbs, the most irregular of all being ve "be".

Forms of verb ve "to be"
Form	Independent	Dependent	Relative
Present	ta	vel, nel	–
Preterite	va	row	–
Future	bee'm, beemayd, bee	(same as independent)	vees
Conditional	veign, veagh	beign, beagh	–
Imperative	bee	(same as independent)	–

==== Prepositions ====
Like the other Insular Celtic languages, Manx has inflected prepositions, contractions of a preposition with a pronominal direct object, as the following common prepositions show. Note the sometimes identical form of the uninflected preposition and its third person singular masculine inflected form.

Conjugation of Manx prepositions using pronominal ending
	1st person		2nd person		3rd person		
	singular	plural	singular	plural	singular		plural
	singular	plural	singular	plural	masculine	feminine	plural
ayns "in"	aynym	ayn, ayndooin	aynyd	ayndiu	ayn	aynjee	ayndoo, ayndaue
da "to"	dou	dooin	dhyt	diu	da	jee	daue
ec "at"	aym	ain	ayd	orroo	echey	eck	oc
er "on"	orrym	orrin	ort	erriu	er	urree	orroo
lesh "with"	lhiam	lhien	lhiat	lhiu	lesh	lhee	lhieu
veih, voish "from"	voym	voin	voyd	veue	voish, veih	voee	voue

==== Numbers ====
Numbers are traditionally vigesimal in Manx, e.g. feed "twenty", daeed "forty" ("two twenties"), tree feed "sixty" ("three twenties").

English	Manx	Irish cognate	Scottish Gaelic cognate
one	un [æːn, oːn, uːn] nane [neːn]	aon [eːnˠ, iːnˠ], (Northwest Ulster) [ɯːnˠ]	aon [ɯːn]
two	daa [d̪æː], ghaa [ɣæː], jees [dʒiːs]	dó [d̪ˠoː], d(h)á [ɣaː/d̪ˠaː],(people only) dís [dʲiːʃ]*	dà [t̪aː]
three	tree [t̪riː]	trí [tʲrʲiː]	trì [t̪ʰɾiː]
four	kiare [kʲæːə(r)]	ceathair [cahərʲ], ceithre [ˈcɛɾʲə]	ceithir [ˈkʲʰehɪɾʲ]
five	queig [kweɡ]	cúig [kuːɟ]	còig [kʰoːkʲ]
six	shey [ʃeː]	sé [ʃeː]	sia [ʃiə]
seven	shiaght [ʃæːx]	seacht [ʃaxt̪ˠ]	seachd [ʃɛxk], [ʃaxk]
eight	hoght [hoːx]	ocht [ɔxt̪ˠ]	ochd [ɔxk]
nine	nuy [nɛi, nøi, niː]	naoi [n̪ˠiː (n̪ˠɰiː)]	naoi [n̪ˠɤi]
ten	jeih [dʒɛi]	deich [dʲɛç, -ɛh, -ɛi]*	deich [tʲeç]
eleven	nane jeig [neːn dʒeɡ]	aon déag [eːnˠ/iːnˠ dʲeːɡ]*	aon deug/diag [ɯːn dʲeːk], [ɯːn dʲiək]
twelve	daa yeig [d̪eiɡʲ]	dó dhéag [d̪ˠoː jeːg], d(h)á dhéag [ɣaː/d̪ˠaː jeːɡ]	dà dheug/dhiag [t̪aː ʝeːk], [t̪aː ʝiək]
thirteen	tree jeig [t̪ri dʒeɡ]	trí déag [tʲrʲiː dʲeːɡ]*	trì deug/diag [t̪ʰɾiː tʲeːk], [t̪ʰɾiː tʲiək]
twenty	feed [fiːdʒ]	fiche [fʲɪçə, -hə]; fichid (sing. dat.) [ˈfʲɪçədʲ, -ɪhə-]*	fichead [fiçət̪]
hundred	keead [kiːəd]	céad [ceːd̪ˠ, ciːa̯d̪ˠ]	ceud, ciad [kʲʰeːt̪], [kʲʰiət̪]

*In the northern dialects of Irish /dʲ tʲ/ may be affricated to [dʒ tʃ] or [dʑ tɕ].

== Syntax ==
Like most Insular Celtic languages, Manx is a VSO language. However, most finite verbs are formed periphrastically, using an auxiliary verb in conjunction with the verbal noun. In this case, only the auxiliary verb precedes the subject, while the verbal noun comes after the subject. The auxiliary verb may be a modal verb rather than a form of bee ("be") or jannoo ("do"). Particles like the negative cha ("not") precede the inflected verb. Examples:

{main verb} {} subject {} {direct object} {}
Hug yn saggyrt e laue urree.
put-PRET the priest his hand {on her}
"The priest put his hand on her."

{aux. verb} {} subject {main verb} {} {direct object}
Va ny eayin gee yn conney.
were the lambs eat-V.N. the gorse
"The lambs used to eat the gorse."

{} {modal verb} subject {main verb} {direct object}
Cha jarg shiu fakin {red erbee.}
not can you-PL see-V.N. anything
"You can't see anything."

When the auxiliary verb is a form of jannoo ("do"), the direct object precedes the verbal noun and is connected to it with the particle y:

{aux. verb} subject {direct object} {} {main verb}
Ren ad {my choraa} y chlashtyn.
did they {my voice} PTCL hear-V.N.
"They heard my voice."

As in Irish (cf. Irish syntax#The forms meaning "to be"), there are two ways of expressing "to be" in Manx: with the substantive verb bee, and with the copula. The substantive verb is used when the predicate is an adjective, adverb, or prepositional phrase. Examples:

t' eh agglagh
is it awful/frightening
"It is awful/frightening."

t' eh {dy mie}
is he well
"He is well"

t' eh ayns y thie-oast
is he in the house-ale
"He is in the ale-house (pub)."

Where the predicate is a noun, it must be converted to a prepositional phrase headed by the preposition in ("in") + possessive pronoun (agreeing with the subject) in order for the substantive verb to be grammatical:

t' eh ny wooinney mie
is he in-his man good
"He is a good man" (lit. "He is in his good man")

Otherwise, the copula is used when the predicate is a noun. The copula itself takes the form is or she in the present tense, but it is often omitted in affirmative statements:

She Manninagh mish
COP Manxman me
"I am a Manxman."

Shoh 'n dooinney
this the man
"This is the man."

In questions and negative sentences, the present tense of the copula is nee:

Cha nee mish eh
not COP me him
"I am not him."

Nee shoh 'n lioar?
COP this the book
"Is this the book?"

== Vocabulary ==
Manx vocabulary is predominantly of Goidelic origin, derived from Old Irish and has cognates in Irish and Scottish Gaelic. However, Manx itself, as well as the languages from which it is derived, borrowed words from other languages, especially Latin, Old Norse, French (particularly Anglo-Norman), and English (both Middle English and Modern English).

The following table shows a selection of nouns from the Swadesh list and indicates their pronunciations and etymologies.

Manx	IPA	English	Etymology
aane	[eːn]	liver	Goidelic; from Mid.Ir. ae < O.Ir. óa; cf. Ir. ae, Sc.G. adha
aer	[eːə]	sky	Latin; from O.Ir. aer < L. aër; cf. Ir. aer, Sc.G. adhar
aile	[ail]	fire	Goidelic; from O.Ir. aingel "very bright"; cf. Ir., Sc.G. aingeal
ardnieu	[ərd̪ˈnʲeu]	snake	Apparently "highly poisonous" (cf. ard "high", nieu "poison")
awin	[aunʲ], [ˈawənʲ]	river	Goidelic; from the M.Ir. dative form abainn of aba < O.Ir. abaind aba; cf. Ir. abha/abhainn, dative abhainn, Sc.G. abhainn (literary nominative abha).
ayr	[ˈæːar]	father	Goidelic; from M.Ir. athair, O.Ir. athir; cf. Ir., Sc.G. athair
beeal	[biəl]	mouth	Goidelic; from O.Ir. bél; cf. Ir. béal, Sc.G. beul/bial
beishteig	[beˈʃtʲeːɡ], [prəˈʃtʲeːɡ]	worm	Latin; from M.Ir. piast, péist < O.Ir. bíast < L. bēstia
ben	[beᵈn]	woman	Goidelic; from M.Ir and O.Ir. ben; cf. Ir., Sc.G. bean
billey	[ˈbilʲə]	tree	Goidelic; from O.Ir. bile
blaa	[blæː]	flower	Goidelic; from O.Ir. bláth, Ir. bláth, Sc.G. blàth
blein	[blʲeːnʲ], [blʲiᵈn]	year	Goidelic; from O.Ir. bliadain; cf. Ir. blian, dat. bliain, Sc.G. bliadhna
bodjal	[ˈbaːdʒəl]	cloud	Shortened from bodjal niaul "pillar of cloud" (cf. Sc.G. baideal neòil); bodjal originally meant "pillar" or "battlement"
bolg	[bolɡ]	belly, bag	Goidelic; from O.Ir. bolg, Ir., Sc.G bolg
cass	[kaːs]	foot	Goidelic; from O.Ir. cos, cf. Sc.G. cas, Ir.dialect cas, Ir. cos
çhengey	[ˈtʃinʲə]	tongue	Goidelic; from O.Ir. tengae; cf. Ir., Sc.G. teanga
clagh	[klaːx]	stone	Goidelic; from O.Ir. cloch; cf. Sc.G. clach, Ir. cloch
cleaysh	[kleːʃ]	ear	Goidelic; from O.Ir. dative clúais "hearing"; cf. Ir., Sc.G. cluas, dative cluais, Ir. dialect cluais
collaneyn	[ˈkalinʲən]	guts	Goidelic; from O.Ir. cáelán; cf. Ir. caolán, Sc.G. caolan, derived from caol "thin, slender", -án nominaliser
crackan	[ˈkraːɣən]	skin	Goidelic; from O.Ir. croiccenn; cf. Ir., Sc.G. craiceann, dialect croiceann
craue	[kræːw]	bone	Goidelic; from O.Ir. cnám; cf. Ir. cnámh, dative cnáimh, Sc.G. cnàimh
cree	[kriː]	heart	Goidelic; from O.Ir. cride; cf. Ir. croí, Sc.G. cridhe
dooinney	[ˈd̪unʲə]	person	Goidelic; from O.Ir. duine, cf. Ir., Sc.G duine
dreeym	[d̪riːm], [d̪riᵇm]	back	Goidelic; from O.Ir. dative druimm, nominative dromm; cf. Ir. drom, dialect droim, dative droim, Sc.G. drom, dialect druim, dative druim
duillag	[ˈd̪olʲaɡ]	leaf	Goidelic; from O.Ir. duilleóg; cf. Ir. duilleóg, Sc.G. duilleag
eairk	[eːak]	horn	Goidelic; from O.Ir. adarc; cf. Ir., Sc.G. adharc, Ir. dialect aidhearc
eayst	[eːs]	moon	Goidelic; from O.Ir. ésca; cf. archaic Ir. éasca, Sc.G. easga
eeast	[jiːs]	fish	Goidelic; from O.Ir. íasc; cf. Ir. iasc, Ul. /jiəsk/, Sc.G. iasg
ennym	[ˈenəm]	name	Goidelic; from O.Ir. ainmm; cf. Ir., Sc.G. ainm
faarkey	[ˈføːɹkə]	sea	Goidelic; from O.Ir. fairrge; cf. Ir. farraige, Sc.G. fairge
faiyr	[feːə]	grass	Goidelic; from O.Ir. fér; cf. Ir. féar, Sc.G. feur, fiar
famman	[ˈfaman]	tail	Goidelic; from O.Ir. femm+ -án nominaliser (masculine diminutive); cf. Ir. feam, Sc.G. feaman
fedjag	[ˈfaiaɡ]	feather	Goidelic; from O.Ir. eteóc; cf. Ir. eiteog "wing", Sc.G. iteag
feeackle	[ˈfiːɣəl]	tooth	Goidelic; from O.Ir. fíacail; cf. Ir., Sc.G. fiacail
feill	[feːlʲ]	meat	Goidelic; from O.Ir. dative feóil; cf. Ir. feoil, Sc.G. feòil
fer	[fer]	man	Goidelic; from O.Ir. fer; cf. Ir., Sc.G. fear
fliaghey	[flʲaːɣə]	rain	Goidelic; from O.Ir. flechud; cf. Ir. fleachadh "rainwater; a drenching", related to fliuch "wet"
folt	[folt̪]	hair	Goidelic; from O.Ir. folt, Ir.folt, Sc.G. falt
fraue	[fræːw]	root	Goidelic; from O.Ir. frém; cf. Ir. fréamh, préamh, Sc.G. freumh
fuill	[folʲ]	blood	Goidelic; from O.Ir. fuil, Ir., Sc.G. fuil
geay	[ɡiː]	wind	Goidelic; from O.Ir. dative gaíth; cf. Ir., Sc.G. gaoth, dative gaoith
geinnagh	[ˈɡʲanʲax]	sand	Goidelic; from O.Ir. gainmech; cf. Sc.G. gainmheach, Ir. gaineamh
glioon	[ɡlʲuːnʲ]	knee	Goidelic; from O.Ir. dative glúin; cf. Ir. glúin, Sc.G. glùn, dative glùin
grian	[ɡriːn], [ɡriᵈn]	sun	Goidelic; from O.Ir. grían; cf. Ir., Sc.G. grian
jaagh	[ˈdʒæːax]	smoke	Goidelic, from M.Ir. deathach < O.Ir. dé; cf. Sc.G. deathach
joan	[dʒaun]	dust	Goidelic; from O.Ir. dend; cf. Ir. deannach
kay	[kʲæː]	fog	Goidelic; from O.Ir. ceó; cf. Ir. ceo, Sc.G. ceò
keayn	[kiᵈn]	sea	Goidelic; from O.Ir. cúan; cf. Ir. cuan "harbor", Sc.G. cuan "ocean"
keeagh	[kiːx]	breast	Goidelic; from O.Ir. cíoch; cf. Ir. cíoch, Sc.G. cìoch
keyll	[kiːlʲ], [kelʲ]	forest	Goidelic; from O.Ir. caill; cf. Ir. coill, Sc.G. coille
kione	[kʲaun], [kʲoːn]	head	Goidelic; from O.Ir. cend, dative ciond; cf. Ir., Sc.G. ceann, dative cionn
laa	[læː]	day	Goidelic; from O.Ir. láa; cf. Ir. lá, Sc.G. latha, là
laue	[læːw]	hand	Goidelic; from O.Ir. lám; cf. Ir. lámh, Sc.G. làmh
leoie	[løi]	ashes	Goidelic; from O.Ir. dative lúaith; cf. Ir. luaith, Sc.G. luath
logh	[lɒːx]	lake	Goidelic; from O.Ir. loch
lurgey	[løɹɡə]	leg	Goidelic; from O.Ir. lurga "shin bone"; cf. Ir. lorga
maidjey	[ˈmaːʒə]	stick	Goidelic; from O.Ir. maide, Ir., Sc.G. maide
meeyl	[miːl]	louse	Goidelic; from O.Ir. míol; cf. Ir. míol, Sc.G. mial
mess	[meːs]	fruit	Goidelic; from O.Ir. mes; cf. Ir., Sc.G. meas
moddey	[ˈmaːðə]	dog	Goidelic; from O.Ir. matrad; cf. Ir. madra, N.Ir. mada,madadh [madu], Sc.G. madadh
moir	[mɒːɹ]	mother	Goidelic; from O.Ir. máthir; cf. Ir. máthair, Sc.G. màthair
mwannal	[ˈmonal]	neck	Goidelic; from O.Ir. muinél; cf. Ir. muineál, muinéal, Sc.G. muineal
oie	[ei], [iː]	night	Goidelic; from O.Ir. adaig (accusative aidchi); cf. Ir. oíche, Sc.G. oidhche
ooh	[au], [uː]	egg	Goidelic; from O.Ir. og; cf. Ir. ubh,ugh, Sc.G. ugh
paitçhey	[ˈpætʃə]	child	French; from E.M.Ir. páitse "page, attendant" < O.Fr. page; cf. Ir. páiste, Sc.G. pàiste
raad	[ræːd̪], [raːd̪]	road	English; from Cl.Ir. rót,róat< M.E. road; cf. Ir. ród, Sc.G. rathad
rass	[raːs]	seed	Goidelic; from O.Ir. ros
rollage	[roˈlæːɡ]	star	Goidelic; from M.Ir. rétlu < O.Ir. rétglu + feminine diminutive suffix -óg; cf. Ir. réaltóg, Sc.G. reultag
roost	[ruːs]	bark	Brythonic; from O.Ir. rúsc Brythonic (cf. Welsh rhisg(l); cf. Ir. rúsc, Sc.G. rùsg
skian	[ˈskiːən]	wing	Goidelic; from O.Ir. scíathán; cf. Ir. sciathán, Sc.G. sgiathan
slieau	[slʲuː], [ʃlʲuː]	mountain	Goidelic, from O.Ir. slíab; cf. Ir., Sc.G. sliabh
sniaghtey	[ˈʃnʲaxt̪ə]	snow	Goidelic; from O.Ir. snechta; cf. Ir. sneachta, Sc.G. sneachd
sollan	[ˈsolan]	salt	Goidelic; from O.Ir., Ir., Sc.G. salann
sooill	[suːlʲ]	eye	Goidelic; from O.Ir. súil; cf. Ir. súil, Sc.G. sùil
stroin	[st̪ruᵈnʲ], [st̪raiᵈnʲ]	nose	Goidelic; from O.Ir. dative sróin; cf. Ir. srón, dialect sróin, dative sróin, Sc.G. sròn, dative sròin
tedd	[t̪ed̪]	rope	Goidelic; from O.Ir. tét; cf. Ir. téad, Sc.G. teud, tiad
thalloo	[ˈtalu]	earth	Goidelic; from O.Ir. talam; cf. Ir., Sc.G. talamh
ushag	[ˈoʒaɡ]	bird	Goidelic; from O.Ir. uiseóg "lark"; cf. Ir. fuiseog, Sc.G. uiseag
ushtey	[ˈuʃtʲə]	water	Goidelic; from O.Ir. uisce; cf. Ir. uisce, Sc.G. uisge
yngyn	[ˈiŋən]	fingernail	Goidelic; from O.Ir. ingen; cf. Ir., Sc.G. ionga, dative iongain, plural Ir. iongna, Sc.G. iongnan, etc.

See Celtic Swadesh lists for the complete list in all the Celtic languages.

=== Phrases ===
Manx (Gaelg)	English (Baarle)
Moghrey mie	Good morning
Fastyr mie	Good afternoon/evening
Oie vie	Good night
Kys t'ou? ("tu" form); Kys ta shiu? (plural); Kanys ta shiu? ("vous" form)	How are you
Feer vie	Very well
Gura mie ayd ("tu" form); Gura mie eu ("vous" form)	Thank you
As oo hene? As shiu hene?	And yourself
Slane lhiat Slane lhiu	Goodbye
Whooiney	Yessir (Manx English equivalent of "man" (US: "dude"), as an informal term of address; found as a dhuine in Irish and Scottish Gaelic)
Ellan Vannin	Isle of Man

=== Loanwords ===
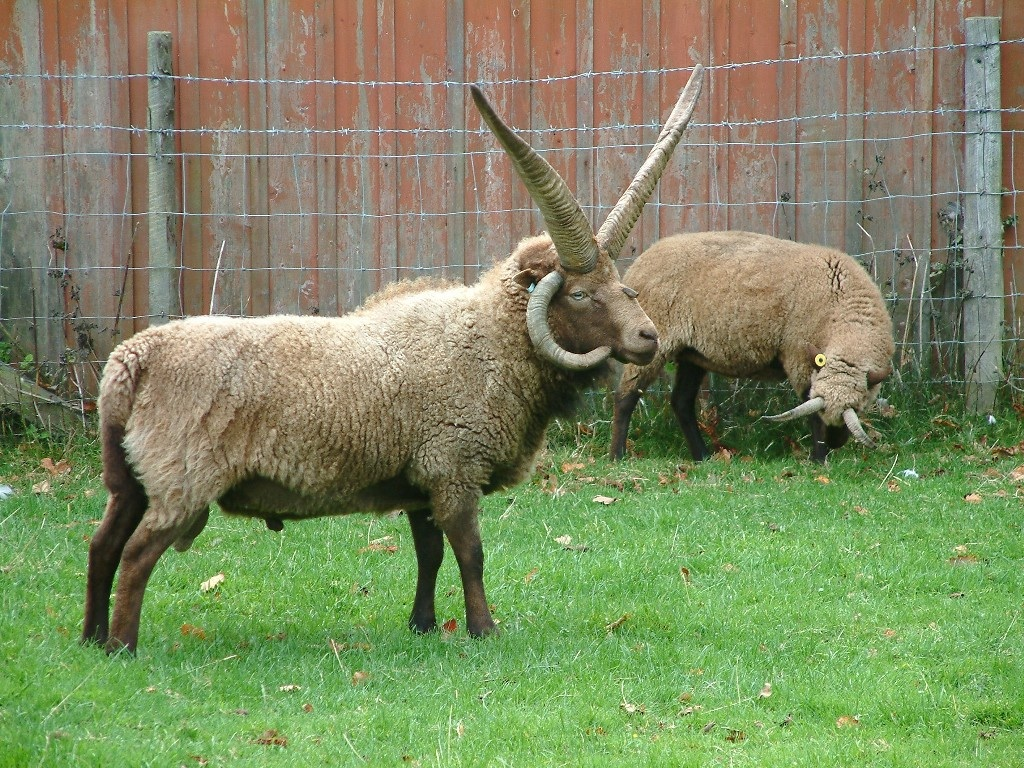
Loaghtan, a Manx breed of primitive sheep. The name means "mousy grey" in Manx.

Loanwords are primarily Norse and English, with a smaller number coming from French. Some examples of Norse loanwords are garey "garden" (from garðr "enclosure") and sker "sea rock" (from sker). Examples of French loanwords are danjeyr "danger" (from danger) and vondeish "advantage" (from avantage).

English loanwords were common in late (pre-revival) Manx, e.g. boy "boy", badjer "badger", rather than the more usual native Gaelic guilley and brock. In more recent years, there has been a reaction against such borrowing, resulting in coinages for technical vocabulary. Despite this, calques exist in Manx, not necessarily obvious to its speakers. To fill gaps in recorded Manx vocabulary, revivalists have referred to modern Irish and Scottish Gaelic for words and inspiration.

Some religious terms come ultimately from Latin, Greek and Hebrew, e.g. casherick "holy" (from Latin consecrātus), agglish "church" (from Greek ἐκκλησία/ekklesia "assembly") and abb "abbot" (from Hebrew אבא/abba "father"). These did not necessarily come directly into Manx, but via Old Irish. In more recent times, ulpan has been borrowed from modern Hebrew. Many Irish and English loanwords also have a classical origin, e.g. çhellveeish "television" (Irish teilifís) and çhellvane "telephone". Foreign language words (usually via English) are used occasionally especially for ethnic food, e.g. chorizo and spaghetti.

Going in the other direction, Manx Gaelic has influenced Manx English (Anglo-Manx). Common words and phrases in Anglo-Manx originating in the language include tholtan "ruined farmhouse", quaaltagh "first-foot", keeill "(old) church", cammag, traa-dy-liooar "time enough", and Tynwald (tinvaal), which is ultimately of Norse origin, but comes from Manx. It is suggested that the House of Keys takes its name from Kiare as Feed (four and twenty), which is the number of its sitting members.

=== Vocabulary comparison examples ===
Manx	Irish	Scottish Gaelic	Welsh	English
Moghrey mie	Maidin mhaith	Madainn mhath	Bore da	good morning
Fastyr mie	Tráthnóna maith	Feasgar math	Prynhawn da Noswaith dda	good afternoon/evening
Slane lhiat, Slane lhiu	Slán leat, Slán libh	Slàn leat, Slàn leibh	Hwyl fawr	goodbye
Gura mie ayd, Gura mie eu	Go raibh maith agat, Go raibh maith agaibh	Tapadh leat, Tapadh leibh	Diolch	thank you
baatey	bád	bàta	cwch	boat
barroose	bus	bus	bws	bus
blaa	bláth	blàth	blodyn	flower
booa	bó	bò	buwch/bo	cow
cabbyl	capall	each	ceffyl	horse
cashtal	caisleán, caiseal	caisteal	castell	castle
creg	carraig	carraig, creag	carreg, craig	crag, rock
eeast	iasc	iasg	pysgodyn	fish [sg.]
ellan	oileán	eilean	ynys	island, eyot
gleashtan	gluaisteán, carr	càr	car	car
kayt	cat	cat	cath	cat
moddey	madra, madadh	cù	ci	dog, hound
shap	siopa	bùth	siop	shop
thie	tigh, teach	taigh	tŷ	house
eean	éan	eun, ian	aderyn, edn	bird
jees, daa	dá, dhá, dó; (people) beirt, dís	dà, dhà; (people) dithis	dau (m.)/dwy (f.)	two
oik	oifig	oifis	swyddfa	office
ushtey	uisce	uisge	dŵr, dwfr	water

== Example text ==
Article 1 of the Universal Declaration of Human Rights in Manx:

Manx
Ta dy chooilley ghooinney ruggit seyr as corrym rish dy chooilley ghooinney elley ayns ooashley as ayns cairys. Ta resoon as cooinsheanse stowit orroo as lhisagh ad dellal rish y cheilley lesh spyrryd braaragh.

English
All human beings are born free and equal in dignity and rights. They are endowed with reason and conscience and should act towards one another in a spirit of brotherhood.

The following examples are taken from Broderick 1984–86, 1:178–79 and 1:350–53. The first example is from a speaker of Northern Manx, the second from Ned Maddrell, a speaker of Southern Manx.

Orthography (+ phonetic transcription)	Gloss
V'ad smooinaghtyn dy beagh cabbyl jeeaghyn skee as deinagh ayns y voghree dy beagh eh er ve ec ny ferrishyn fud ny h-oie as beagh ad cur lesh yn saggyrt dy cur e vannaght er. vod̪ ˈsmuːnʲaxt̪ən d̪ə biəx ˈkaːbəl dʒiːən skiː as ˈd̪øinʲax uns ə ˈvoːxəri d̪ə biəx e er vi ek nə ˈferiʃən fod̪ nə høi as biəx əd̪ kør leʃ ən ˈsaːɡərt̪ d̪ə kør ə ˈvanax er	They used to think if a horse was looking tired and weary in the morning then it had been with the fairies all night and they would bring the priest to put his blessing on it.
Va ben aynshoh yn çhiaghtin chaie as v'ee laccal mish dy ynsagh ee dy gra yn Padjer yn Çhiarn. {} Dooyrt ee dy row ee gra eh tra v'ee inneen veg, {} agh t'eh ooilley jarroodit eck, {} as v'ee laccal gynsagh eh reesht son dy gra eh ec vrastyl ny red ennagh. {} As dooyrt mish dy jinnagh mee jannoo my share son dy cooney lhee as ren ee çheet aynshoh son dy clashtyn eh, {} as vel oo laccal dy clashtyn mee dy gra eh? {} və ˈbɛn əˈsoː ən ˈtʃaːn ˈkai as vai ˈlaːl ˈmiʃ ði ˈjinðax i ðə ˈɡreː in ˈpaːdʒər ən ˈtʃaːrn ‖ d̪ot̪ i ðə ˈrau i ɡreː a ˈt̪reː vai iˈnʲin ˈveːɡ ‖ ax t̪e ˈolʲu dʒaˈrud̪ətʃ ek ‖ as vei ˈlaːl ˈɡʲinðax a ˈriːʃ san ðə ˈɡreː ə əɡ ˈvraːst̪əl nə ˈrið ənax ‖ as ˈd̪ut̪ miʃ ðə ˈdʒinax mi ˈdʒinu mə ˈʃeː san ðə ˈkunə lʲei as ˈrenʲ i ˈtʃit̪ oˈsoː san ðə ˈklaːʃtʲən a ‖ as vel u ˈlaːl ðə ˈklaːʃtʲən mi ðə ˈɡreː a ‖	There was a woman here last week and she wanted me to teach her to say the Lord's Prayer. She said that she used to say it when she was a little girl, but she has forgotten it all, and she wanted to learn it again to say it at a class or something. And I said I would do my best to help her and she came here to hear it, and do you want to hear me say it?

=== Lord's Prayer comparison ===
The Lord's Prayer has been translated into all of the Gaelic languages (and Old Irish). Although not direct, it is a good demonstration of the differences between their orthographies.

The standard version of the Lord's Prayer in Manx

Ayr ain t'ayns niau,
Casherick dy row dt'ennym.
Dy jig dty reeriaght.
Dt'aigney dy row jeant er y thalloo,
myr t'ayns niau.
Cur dooin nyn arran jiu as gagh laa,
as leih dooin nyn loghtyn,
myr ta shin leih dauesyn ta jannoo loghtyn nyn 'oi.
As ny leeid shin ayns miolagh,
agh livrey shin veih olk:
Son lhiats y reeriaght, as y phooar, as y ghloyr, son dy bragh as dy bragh.
Amen.

Manx version of 1713

Ayr Ain, t'ayns Niau;
Casherick dy rou dt'ennym;
Di jig dty Reereeaght;
Dt'aigney dy rou jeant er y Talloo
myr ta ayns Niau;
Cur dooin nyn Arran jiu as gagh laa;
As leih dooin nyn Loghtyn,
myr ta shin leih dauesyn ta janoo loghtyn ny noi shin;
As ny leeid shin ayns Miolagh;
Agh livrey shin veih olk;
Son liats y Reereeaght y Phooar as y Ghloyr, son dy bragh as dy bragh.
Amen

The prayer in Old Irish

A athair fil hi nimib,
Noemthar thainm.
Tost do flaithius.
Did do toil i talmain
amail ata in nim.
Tabair dun indiu ar sasad lathi.
Ocus log dun ar fiachu
amail logmaitne diar fhechemnaib.
Ocus nis lecea sind i n-amus n-dofulachtai.
Acht ron soer o cech ulc.
Amen ropfir.

The Prayer in modern Irish

Ár n-Athair, atá ar neamh:
go naofar d'ainm (alt. go naomhaíthear t'ainm).
Go dtaga(idh) do ríocht.
Go ndéantar do thoil ar an (d)talamh,
mar dhéantar ar neamh.
Ár n-arán laethúil tabhair dúinn inniu,
agus maith dúinn ár bhfiacha (alt. ár gcionta),
mar mhaithimid dár bhféichiúna féin (alt. mar a mhaithimíd dóibh a chiontaíonn inár n-aghaidh).
Agus ná lig sinn i gcathú (alt. i gcathaíbh),
ach saor sinn ó(n) olc.
Óir is leatsa an Ríocht agus an Chumhacht agus an Ghlóir, trí shaol na saol (alt. le saol na saol / go síoraí).
Áiméan.

The Prayer in Scottish Gaelic

Ar n-Athair a tha air nèamh,
Gu naomhaichear d' ainm.
Thigeadh do rìoghachd.
Dèanar do thoil air an talamh,
mar a nithear air nèamh.
Tabhair dhuinn an-diugh ar n-aran làitheil.
Agus maith dhuinn ar fiachan,
amhail a mhaitheas sinne dar luchd-fiach.
Agus na leig ann am buaireadh sinn;
ach saor sinn o olc:
oir is leatsa an rìoghachd, agus a' chumhachd, agus a' ghlòir, gu sìorraidh.
Amen.

== See also ==
- Cornish, another revived Celtic language.
- Irish language revival
- List of Celtic-language media
- List of revived languages
- List of television channels in Celtic languages

== Bibliography ==
- Broderick, George (1984–1986). A Handbook of Late Spoken Manx (3 volumes ed.). Tübingen: Niemeyer. ISBN 3-484-42903-8. (vol. 1), (vol. 2), (vol. 3).
- Broderick, George (1993). "Manx". In Ball, M. J.; Fife, J. (eds.). The Celtic Languages. London: Routledge. pp. 228–85. ISBN 0-415-01035-7.
- Cumming, Joseph George (1848). The Isle of Man. London: John Van Voorst.
- Dictionary of the Irish Language based mainly on Old and Middle Irish materials. Dublin: Royal Irish Academy. 1983. ISBN 0-901714-29-1.
- Gunther, Wilf (1990). "Language conservancy or: Can the anciently established British minority languages survive?". In Gorter, D.; Hoekstra, J. F.; Jansma, L. G.; Ytsma, J. (eds.). Fourth International Conference on Minority Languages (Vol. II: Western and Eastern European Papers ed.). Bristol, England: Multilingual Matters. pp. 53–67. ISBN 1-85359-111-4.
- Holmer, Nils M. (1957). The Gaelic of Arran. Dublin Institute for Advanced Studies. ISBN 0-901282-44-8.
- Holmer, Nils M. (1962). The Gaelic of Kintyre. Dublin Institute for Advanced Studies. ISBN 0-901282-43-X.
- Hughes, Art (1994). "Gaeilge Uladh" [Ulster Irish]. In McCone, K.; McManus, D.; Ó Háinle, C.; Williams, N.; Breatnach, L. (eds.). Stair na Gaeilge in ómós do Pádraig Ó Fiannachta [History of Irish in honor of Pádraig Ó Fiannachta] (in Irish). Maynooth: Department of Old Irish, St. Patrick's College. pp. 611–660. ISBN 0-901519-90-1.
- Jackson, Kenneth Hurlstone (1955). Contributions to the Study of Manx Phonology. Edinburgh: Nelson.
- Kelly, John (1870). Gill, William (ed.). A Practical Grammar of the Antient Gaelic, or Language of the Isle of Man, Usually Called Manks. Douglas: The Manx Society.
- Kewley-Draskau, Jennifer (2008). Practical Manx. Liverpool University Press. ISBN 978-1-84631-131-4.
- Kneen, John J. (1911). A Grammar of the Manx Language. Edinburgh: Ams Pr Inc. ISBN 978-0-404-17564-1.
- Lewin, Christopher (2020). Aspects of the historical phonology of Manx (PhD thesis). Edinburgh: University of Edinburgh. doi:10.7488/era/557.
- Lewin, Christopher. Sheean as Screeu. St John's: Culture Vannin.
- Macbain, Alexander (1911). An Etymological Dictionary of the Gaelic Language (2nd ed.). Stirling: E. Mackay. Reprinted 1998, New York: Hippocrene. ISBN 0-7818-0632-1.
- Mhac an Fhailigh, Éamonn (1968). The Irish of Erris, Co. Mayo. Dublin Institute for Advanced Studies. ISBN 0-901282-02-2.
- Ó Baoill, Colm (1978). Contributions to a Comparative Study of Ulster Irish and Scottish Gaelic. Institute of Irish Studies, Queen's University of Belfast.
- O'Rahilly, Thomas F. (1932). Irish Dialects Past and Present. Dublin: Browne and Nolan. Reprinted 1976, 1988 by the Dublin Institute for Advanced Studies. ISBN 0-901282-55-3.
- Ó Cuív, Brian (1944). The Irish of West Muskerry, Co. Cork. Dublin Institute for Advanced Studies. ISBN 0-901282-52-9.
- Ó Sé, Diarmuid (2000). Gaeilge Chorca Dhuibhne [Chorca Dhuibhne Irish] (in Irish). Dublin: Institiúid Teangeolaíochta Éireann. ISBN 0-946452-97-0.
- Thomson, Robert L. (1992). "The Manx language". In MacAulay, Donald (ed.). The Celtic Languages. Cambridge University Press. pp. 100–36. ISBN 0-521-23127-2.
- Williams, Nicholas (1994). "An Mhanainnis" [Manx]. In McCone, K.; McManus, D.; Ó Háinle, C.; Williams, N.; Breatnach, L. (eds.). Stair na Gaeilge in ómós do Pádraig Ó Fiannachta [History of Irish in honor of Pádraig Ó Fiannachta] (in Irish). Maynooth: Department of Old Irish, St. Patrick's College. pp. 703–44. ISBN 0-901519-90-1.
