= List of newspapers in the Isle of Man =

This is a list of newspapers in the Isle of Man. The company Isle of Man Newspapers (owned by Tindle) publishes the following three newspapers:

- Isle of Man Courier (weekly, free)
- Isle of Man Examiner (weekly)
- Manx Independent (weekly)

== See also ==
- Yn Pabyr Seyr
