= Isle of Man Home Guard =

- Country: United KingdomIsle of Man
- Type: Infantry
- Size: Regiment
- Garrison/HQ: Isle of Man

The 'Isle of Man Home Guard' was raised during the Second World War for home defence of the Isle of Man, there being no regular or territorial army unit in the Crown Dependency (although units such as the Isle of Man Volunteers had existed previously).
