= Brewers' Act 1874 =

Law regulating beer ingredients

The Brewers' Act 1874, also known as the Isle of Man Pure Beer Act, the Manx Pure Beer Act or simply the Pure Beer Act, is a law on the Isle of Man regulating the ingredients in beer. It was enacted by the Tynwald, the island's legislature in 1874, stating that only water, malt, sugar and hops were allowed to be used in production. The law was introduced after campaigning by Dr William Okell, founder of the Okells Brewery. Because of the legal autonomy of the Isle of Man, the UK's Inland Revenue Act 1880 (43 & 44 Vict. c. 20), also known as the Free Mash Tun Act, which relaxed a tax on malt and other restrictions in the United Kingdom did not apply there, and so the act remained upheld.

The law has been encouraged by the Campaign for Real Ale, who have strongly criticised any changes and say it allows a better class of ale to be produced. The current head of the Okells Brewery, Dr Mike Cowbourne, has stated that the law has been an important aspect of the company's beers achieving widespread export and acceptance.

In 1999, there was a significant debate about whether the law should be changed, Pamela Crowe tried to scrap the law, and all breweries campaigned against it. The eventual outcome was a slight relaxation of the law, which permitted the brewing of lager, wheat beer and fruit beer. Okells used the changes in the law to produce a Canadian lager, which drew criticism from the local brewing community. However, Bushy's head, Martin Brunnschweiler, says the act helped their Ruby Mild beer win a regional beer award, because they could not add chemicals or preservatives.

In 2002, the Department of Health considered changing the law to allow the addition of Vitamin B1, which would help reduce alcohol induced brain damage.
