= Isle of Man Examiner =

Newspaper on the Isle of Man

- Type: Weekly newspaper
- Format: Tabloid
- Owner: Isle of Man Newspapers
- Publisher: Tindle Newspapers
- Founded: 1880
- Headquarters: Douglas, Isle of Man
- Sister newspapers: Isle of Man Courier; Manx Independent
- Website: www.iomtoday.co.im

The Isle of Man Examiner is a newspaper in the Isle of Man.

The paper is published every Tuesday, and is owned by Isle of Man Newspapers, which is now part of the Tindle Group.

Popular features include business news, the Final Whistle sports supplement and Terry Cringle's Times Past column.

Its sister weekly newspaper titles are the Isle of Man Courier and the Manx Independent.

The Examiner began in 1880 and was the island's most popular newspaper for most of the 20th century. It is still the biggest-selling newspaper on the Isle of Man.

On 10 May 2011, after 131 years, the Isle of Man Examiner changed its format from broadsheet to tabloid.
