= Manx Independent =

Newspaper on the Isle of Man

- Type: Weekly newspaper
- Owner(s): Isle of Man Newspapers
- Publisher: Tindle
- Founded: 1987

The Manx Independent is a tabloid weekly newspaper in the Isle of Man. It is published every Friday.

It is owned by Isle of Man Newspapers, which is now part of Tindle Newspapers.

Its sister weekly newspapers are the Isle of Man Courier and the Isle of Man Examiner.

== History ==
It was founded as a broadsheet in 1987 after a strike that closed the Isle of Man Examiner, the Isle of Man Times, the Isle of Man Gazette and the Manx Star. The Isle of Man Examiner title was later revived by the Halifax Courier Group, owner of the Isle of Man Courier.

The original concept for the Manx Independent came from a local Manx man named Harold Stanley Corlett, affectionately known as Stan Corlett (1934-1992) son of Edith Isabel (Taggart) and James Stanley Corlett. Stan Corlett (Director at Mercantile) previously served as a councillor for Wokingham and had also taught economics at Ashridge Business School in Hertfordshire returned to the Isle of Man in 1976 at the age of 43 with the mission of finding a way to "Give a voice to the Manx people". Later he was to join the Mercantile Group and see his dream become a reality in developing a newspaper that was unafraid to cover current issues affecting the island's residents.

For a short time the Manx Independent was published three times a week, produced by the former IOM Weekly Times staff and edited by Simon Richardson. It then became a twice-weekly tabloid, originally owned by Mercantile Publishers and then sold to Morton Newspapers from Northern Ireland in the early 1992.

It was sold to rival newspaper group Isle of Man Newspapers in 1993, resulting in closure and the redundancy of all staff. It was later revived in that year in its current weekly format.
