= Okells Brewery =

Okells
- Location: Douglas, Isle of Man
- Opened: 1850
- Owned by: Heron & Brearley

Okells Brewery is a regional brewery founded in 1850 by Dr. William Okell in Douglas, Isle of Man.

== History ==
Dr. William Okell, a Cheshire surgeon, started Okell's Brewery in Castle Hill, Douglas in 1850. By 1874 Dr. Okell owned many of the pubs on the island, had convinced Tynwald, the island's parliament, to pass the Brewers' Act 1874 ensuring the purity of beer brewed on the Isle of Man, and built The Falcon Steam Brewery just off Broadway in Douglas. This imposing Building still stands today as Sheridan Apartments.

In 1972 Okells was bought by Heron & Brearley, a local drinks company. Then, in 1986, it was merged with Castletown Brewery and H&B was renamed as The Isle of Man Breweries which later reverted to the name Heron and Brearley.

In August 1994 Okells moved to a new purpose built brewery built inside the existing Heron & Brearley Warehouse outside Douglas.

== Availability ==
Beers are available on the Isle of Man and in the UK. Okells have five UK pubs:

- Thomas Rigby's, Liverpool
- The Fly In The Loaf, Liverpool
- The Lady of Mann, Liverpool,
- Bear and Billet, Chester
- The Academy, Aberystwyth, Wales

Plus fifteen pubs in the Market Town Taverns pub chain bought by Heron and Brearley.

The beer is also available through Morgenrot UK beer distributors. Bottled beer is also available in the Isle of Man, Sweden and Finland.

== Beers ==
The company brews five regular cask ales:

- Okells Bitter
- Okells Olaf Mild
- Dr. Okells IPA
- Okells Jiarg
- Okells MPA

Four seasonal beers:

- Spring Ram
- Summer Storm
- Autumn Dawn
- St. Nick

And nine occasional beers:

- Okells Premium Steam
- Okells Alt Altbier
- Okells Maclir Wheat beer.
- Okells Saison
- Dr. Okells Elixir
- Dr. Okells Eastern Spice
- Castletown Bitter
- Olde Skipper
- Aile - a smoked Porter, voted Europe's best Smoked Beer in the 2010, 2011, 2012, and 2013 World Beer Awards.

Also available are Dr. Okells IPA, Okells Maclir, 1907 and Okells Aile, sold in bottles.
