= Isle of Man Newspapers =

Manx newspaper publisher

Isle of Man Newspapers publishes the Isle of Man's newspapers. They are the Isle of Man Examiner, the Isle of Man Courier and the Manx Independent. They are all weekly newspapers. Its website is www.iomtoday.co.im, as well as owning GEF.im.

The company was formerly called the Isle of Man Courier Group until its name was changed in 1992. It was owned by the Halifax Courier group until that was bought out by Johnston Press in 1994. It has been based at Publishing House, Peel Road, Douglas and was purchased by Tindle Newspapers in 2016 for 4.1M.

In 2022 the company left Peel Road, moving in to 18, Finch Road, Douglas.

== Controversies ==
The Isle of Man Newspapers has received criticism from the public for its court reporting procedures, in which defendants making court appearances are named by the press prior to a verdict being issued by the Courts. This has been criticised as a form of public shaming and a violation of the individual right to privacy, even though newspapers around the world report court proceedings in exactly the same way on the basis that "justice must not only be done but it must be seen to be done". In 2022, a petition was circulated demanding an end to this practice, receiving over 1,000 signatures and support from politicians.
