= Isle of Man =

British Crown Dependency in the Irish Sea

Isle of Man Mannin
- Crown Dependency
- Flag Coat of arms
- Motto: Quocunque Jeceris Stabit (Latin) "Wheresover you throw it, it shall stand"
- Anthem: "O Land of Our Birth" (Note: "O Land of Our Birth", was unofficially in use since 1907 and became the national anthem in 2003. "God Save the King" remained the royal anthem and is used as ceremonial music in the presence of the British Crown.)
- Location of the Isle of Man (green), in Europe (dark grey)
- Sovereign state responsible for the Isle of Man: United Kingdom
- Anglo-Saxon control: 7th century
- Norse control: 9th century
- Scottish control: 2 July 1266
- English control: 1399
- Revested into British Crown: 10 May 1765
- Capital and largest city: Douglas; 54.15°N 4.48°W
- Official languages: English; Manx; (Note: English serves de-facto as the primary official working language while Manx is established de-jure)
- Ethnic groups (2021): 89.7% White; 48.2% Manx; 38.4% British; 2.7% Irish; 3.1% Asian; 1.0% Mixed; 0.6% Black; 0.6% other
- Religion (2021): 54.7% Christianity; 43.8% no religion; 0.5% Islam; 0.5% Buddhism; 0.3% Hinduism; 0.1% Judaism; 0.2% other
- Demonym(s): Manx
- Government: Parliamentary constitutional monarchy
  - Lord of Mann: Charles III
  - Lieutenant Governor: Sir John Lorimer
  - Chief Minister: Chris Thomas
- Legislature: Tynwald
  - Upper house: Legislative Council
  - Lower house: House of Keys

Government of the United Kingdom
  - Minister: Baron Lemos

Area
  - Total: 574 km^{2} (222 sq mi) (178)
  - Water (%): 1
- Highest elevation: 620 m (2,030 ft)

Population
  - 2025 estimate: 84,975 (not ranked)
  - 2021 census: 84,069
  - Density: 148/km^{2} (383.3/sq mi) (87th)
- GDP (PPP): 2025 estimate
  - Total: $7.931 billion
  - Per capita: $89,706 (9th)
- GDP (nominal): estimate
  - Total: £5.84 billion (US$7.79 billion) (financial year of 2023/24)
  - Per capita: £69,094 (US$92,173)
- HDI (2022): 0.940 very high · 15th
- Currency: Pound sterling Manx pound (£) (GBP)
- Time zone: UTC±00:00 (GMT)
  - Summer (DST): UTC+01:00 (BST)
- Date format: dd/mm/yyyy
- Mains electricity: 240 V, 50 Hz
- Driving side: Left
- Calling code: +44
- UK postcode: IM1 – IM99
- ISO 3166 code: IM
- Internet TLD: .im

The Isle of Man (Manx: Mannin [ˈmanɪnʲ], also Ellan Vannin [ˈɛlʲan ˈvanɪnʲ]), also known simply as Man or Mann (/mæn/ man), is a self-governing British Crown Dependency in the Irish Sea, between Great Britain and Ireland. As head of state, Charles III holds the title Lord of Mann and is represented by a Lieutenant Governor. The government of the United Kingdom is responsible for the Isle of Man's military defence and represents it abroad, but the Isle of Man still has a separate international identity.

Humans have lived on the island since before 6500 BC. There was Gaelic cultural influence and settlement by the 5th century AD, and the Manx language emerged as a branch of the Goidelic languages. Irish missionaries following the teaching of Saint Patrick spread Christianity on Man. In 627, King Edwin of Northumbria conquered the Isle of Man. In the 9th century, Norsemen founded the Kingdom of the Isles, which included Man and the Hebrides. For most of this period, Man was ruled by the Crovan dynasty and the island was a dependency of Norway. Norwegian King Magnus III reigned as King of Mann and the Isles between 1099 and 1103.

In 1266, Magnus VI of Norway sold his suzerainty over Man to Alexander III of Scotland in the Treaty of Perth. After a period of alternating rule by the Kings of Scotland and England, the island came under the feudal lordship of the English Crown in 1399. The lordship revested in the British Crown in 1765, but the island did not become part of the 18th-century Kingdom of Great Britain, nor of its successors, the United Kingdom of Great Britain and Ireland and the present-day United Kingdom of Great Britain and Northern Ireland. It has always retained its internal self-government. In 1881, the Isle of Man Parliament, Tynwald, became the first national legislative body in the world to give women the right to vote in a general election, although this excluded married women. (Note: In 1893, New Zealand became the first country to grant all women the vote.)

The Manx economy is bolstered by its status as a low tax and offshore banking destination. Insurance and online gambling each generate 17% of the GNI, followed by information and communications technology and banking with 9% each. This status has, however, also brought the problems of money laundering, financial crime, and the financing of terrorism. The Isle of Man is also known for the TT (Tourist Trophy) Motorcycle Races, and the Manx cat, a breed with short or no tails. In 2016, UNESCO awarded the Isle of Man biosphere reserve status.

== Name ==
The earliest reference to the Isle of Man occurs in Pliny's Natural History, which mentions an island named Monapia (likely an error for *Manavia) lying between Britain and Ireland. This has been traced to the Brittonic *Manaua, meaning "mountain island" or "high island". The same root may appear in Môn, the Welsh name for Anglesey. The island is known in Welsh as Manaw and in Manx as Mannin, or in full, Ellan Vannin (i.e. "island of Man", with lenition of the first consonant). Mannin was originally a dative form, the nominative being Mana.

Man was associated in legend with Manannán mac Lir, the Gaelic god of the sea, and was sometimes said to have taken its name from him. It is more likely, however, that the reverse is true.

== History ==
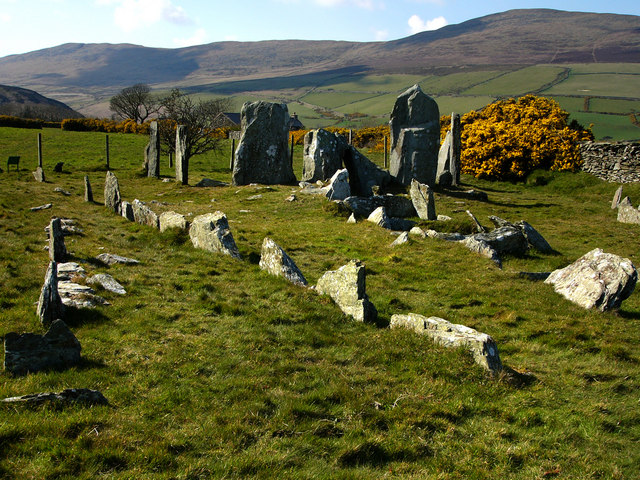
Cashtal yn Ard

In the later part of the Mesolithic Period c.8000 BC, the Isle of Man was cut off from the surrounding islands as sea levels rose following the end of the last ice age. Humans colonised it by travelling by sea some time before 6500 BC. The first occupants were hunter-gatherers and fishermen. Examples of their tools are kept at the Manx Museum.

The Neolithic Period marked the beginning of farming, and the people began to build megalithic monuments, such as Cashtal yn Ard, King Orry's Grave and Mull Hill. There was also the local Ronaldsway culture, unique to the Isle of Man, and the Bann culture.

During the Bronze Age, burial mounds became smaller. The people put bodies into stone-lined graves with ornamental containers. The Bronze Age burial mounds survived as long-lasting markers around the countryside.

The ancient Romans knew of the island and called it Insula Manavia. During the four centuries when Rome ruled the province of Britannia, the Roman military controlled the Irish Sea, providing safe passage of agricultural goods from the productive farms of Anglesey to Roman settlements at the English – Scottish frontier. Only a few Roman artefacts have been found on Man, suggesting a lack of strategic value. No Roman lighthouses or signal towers have yet been found on Man.

In the late Roman period, there was strong Irish (Gaelic) influence throughout the Irish Sea. Roman historian Orosius wrote in the 5th century that the Isle of Man was inhabited by the Irish. The first recorded language on the island was Archaic Irish, which is found on stone inscriptions in the Ogham alphabet, dating to around the 5th century. Ogham stones found in the south of Man are monolingual Irish (like Ballaqueeney Ogham Stone), while those in the north are bilingual Irish and Latin (like Knock y Doonee Ogham Stone). The Ballaqueeney stone seems to commemorate one of the Conailli, an Irish tribe. The Manx language is a Goidelic language that developed from Archaic Irish.

According to Manx tradition, Saint Patrick was responsible for converting the island to Christianity. He is said to have sent missionaries Maughold (Macc Cuill) and Germanus to the island in the 5th century. Muirchú's 7th century Life of Patrick says that when they arrived, there was already a Christian community led by Conindrus and Rumilus, which seem to be Romano-British names. There are more than 200 small chapels called keeills (from Irish cill) on the island, which were built in the first few centuries after Christianization.

From the 7th century, there is evidence of Celtic Britons on the Isle of Man, and possible Brittonic control over the island.

The island came under the control of Anglo-Saxon Northumbria during the reign of king Edwin of Northumbria. He then launched raids from Man into Ireland. How much influence the Northumbrians exerted on Man is unknown, but very few place names on Man are of Old English origin.

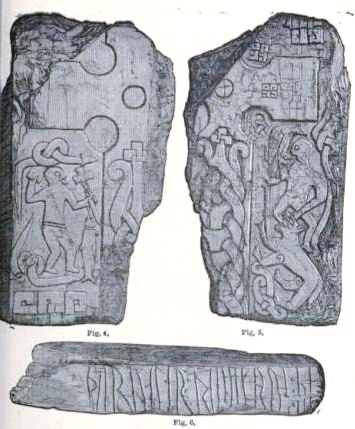
Thorwald's cross slab, including Norse pagan and Christian imagery, as well as Manx runes

Vikings began raiding the island in the late 8th century and later settled there. In around 914, Man came under the rule of a series of Norse-Gaelic kings, beginning with Ragnall ua Ímair of the Uí Ímair or Ivar dynasty. It became part of the Kingdom of the Isles, also known as the "Kingdom of Mann and the Isles" (Old Norse: Suðreyjar, 'Southern Isles', anglicized 'Sodor').

=== 2nd millennium ===
There was a mint producing coins on Man between c. 1025 and c. 1065. These Manx coins were minted from an imported Hiberno-Norse penny die from Dublin. From 1079 onwards, Man was held (with some interruptions) by the Crovan dynasty, founded by Godred Crovan. In 1154 the Diocese of Sodor and Man was formed. The kingdom's capital was on St Patrick's Isle, where Peel Castle was built. The Norse-Gaelic rulers established Tynwald and introduced many land divisions that still exist.

The Kingdom of the Isles about the year 1100

During the whole of the Scandinavian period, Man was a dependency of Norway, but the Kings of Norway rarely asserted their control. A notable exception was Magnus Barefoot. In 1266 Magnus VI of Norway ceded Man to Alexander III, King of Scots, in the Treaty of Perth. But Scottish rule over Man did not become firmly established until 1275, when a Manx revolt was defeated in the Battle of Ronaldsway.

In 1290, King Edward I of England sent Walter de Huntercombe to take possession of Man. It remained in English hands until 1313, when Robert the Bruce of Scotland took it after besieging Castle Rushen for five weeks. In 1314, it was retaken for the English by John Bacach of Argyll. In 1317, it was retaken for the Scots by Thomas Randolph, 1st Earl of Moray and Lord of the Isle of Man. It was held by the Scots until 1333. For some years thereafter control passed back and forth between the two kingdoms until the English took it for the last time in 1346. The English Crown delegated its rule of the island to a series of lords and magnates. Tynwald passed laws concerning the government of the island in all respects and had control over its finances, but was subject to the approval of the Lord of Mann.

In 1765, the Act of Revestment was passed, whereby the feudal rights of the Dukes of Atholl as Lords of Mann were purchased and revested into the British Crown.

During the Napoleonic Wars, the Isle of Man served as a strategically important, but often neglected naval outpost.

In 1866, the Isle of Man obtained limited home rule, with partly democratic elections to the House of Keys, but the Legislative Council was appointed by the Crown. Since then, democratic government has been gradually extended. (The vote was extended to women on equal terms with men, and most of the Legislative Council is now elected by the House of Keys.)

During both World Wars, the island was used for the internment of people originating from enemy countries.

In recent times, the economy of the island has benefited from regulatory arbitrage in various contexts, such as low taxes. These have attracted wealthy individuals and, together with relatively low government interference, industries such as offshore financial services and more recently gambling.

The Isle of Man has designated more than 250 historic sites as registered buildings.

== Geography ==

The Isle of Man is an island located in the middle of the northern Irish Sea, almost equidistant from England to the east, Northern Ireland to the west and Scotland (closest) to the north, while Wales to the south is almost the distance of the Republic of Ireland to the southwest. It is 52 kilometres (32 mi) long and, at its widest point, 22 kilometres (14 mi) wide. It has an area of around 572 square kilometres (221 sq mi). Besides the island of Man itself, the political unit of the Isle of Man includes some nearby small islands: the seasonally inhabited Calf of Man, Chicken Rock (on which stands an unstaffed lighthouse), St Patrick's Isle and St Michael's Isle. The last two of these are connected to the main island by permanent roads/causeways.

Ranges of hills in the north and south are separated by a central valley. The northern plain, by contrast, is relatively flat, consisting mainly of deposits from glacial advances from western Scotland during colder times. There are more recently deposited shingle beaches at the northernmost point, the Point of Ayre. The island has one mountain higher than 600 metres (2,000 ft), Snaefell, with a height of 620 metres (2,034 ft). According to an old saying, from the summit one can see six kingdoms: those of Man, Scotland, England, Ireland, Wales and Heaven. Some versions add a seventh kingdom, that of the sea, or Neptune.

=== Climate ===
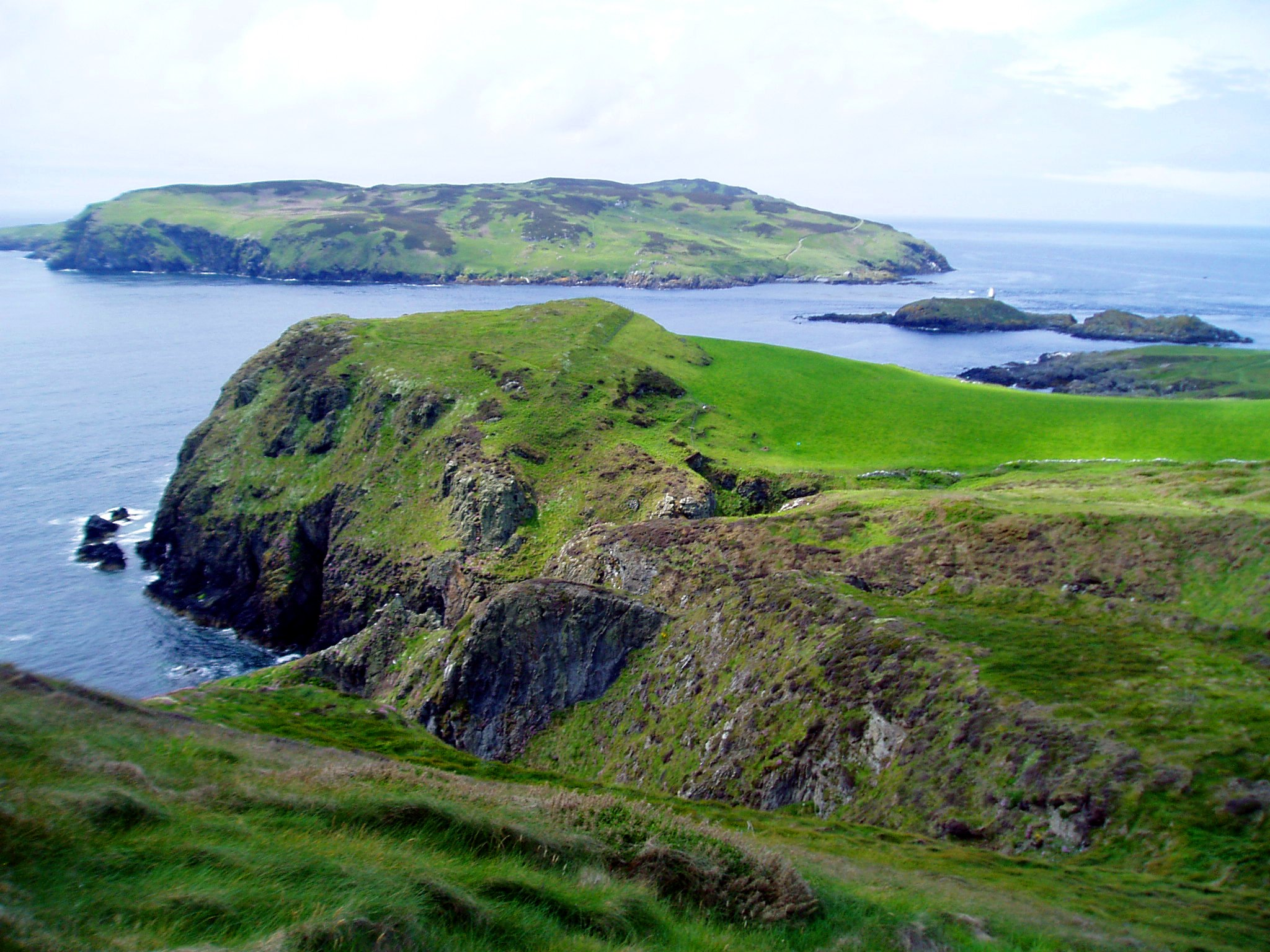
The Calf of Man seen from Cregneash

The Isle of Man has a temperate oceanic climate (Köppen Cfb). Average rainfall is higher than that of the British Isles as a whole because the Isle of Man is far enough from Ireland for the prevailing south-westerly winds to accumulate moisture. Average rainfall is highest at Snaefell, where it is around 1,900 millimetres (75 in) a year. At lower levels it can be around 800 millimetres (31 in) a year. In drier spots, the Isle of Man is sunnier than either Ireland or the majority of England at 1,651 hours per year at the official Ronaldsway station. The highest recorded temperature was 28.9 °C (84.0 °F) in Ronaldsway on 12 July 1983. Due to the moderate surface temperatures of the Irish Sea, the island does not receive bursts of heat that sometimes can hit Northern England. The stable water temperature also means that air frost is rare, averaging just ten occasions per year.

Climate data for Ronaldsway, Isle of Man (1991–2020)
Month	Jan	Feb	Mar	Apr	May	Jun	Jul	Aug	Sep	Oct	Nov	Dec	Year
Record high °C (°F)	13.3 (55.9)	13.2 (55.8)	17.1 (62.8)	20.0 (68.0)	24.0 (75.2)	27.5 (81.5)	28.9 (84.0)	27.8 (82.0)	26.5 (79.7)	22.7 (72.9)	16.3 (61.3)	15.0 (59.0)	28.9 (84.0)
Mean maximum °C (°F)	11.5 (52.7)	11.2 (52.2)	12.7 (54.9)	15.7 (60.3)	20.0 (68.0)	21.8 (71.2)	23.0 (73.4)	21.3 (70.3)	20.0 (68.0)	17.1 (62.8)	14.2 (57.6)	12.4 (54.3)	24.2 (75.6)
Mean daily maximum °C (°F)	8.5 (47.3)	8.4 (47.1)	9.4 (48.9)	11.5 (52.7)	14.3 (57.7)	16.5 (61.7)	18.2 (64.8)	18.2 (64.8)	16.6 (61.9)	13.8 (56.8)	11.1 (52.0)	9.2 (48.6)	13.0 (55.4)
Daily mean °C (°F)	6.4 (43.5)	6.2 (43.2)	7.0 (44.6)	8.7 (47.7)	11.2 (52.2)	13.6 (56.5)	15.4 (59.7)	15.5 (59.9)	14.0 (57.2)	11.5 (52.7)	8.9 (48.0)	7.1 (44.8)	10.4 (50.7)
Mean daily minimum °C (°F)	4.3 (39.7)	3.9 (39.0)	4.5 (40.1)	5.8 (42.4)	8.1 (46.6)	10.6 (51.1)	12.5 (54.5)	12.7 (54.9)	11.4 (52.5)	9.2 (48.6)	6.7 (44.1)	4.9 (40.8)	7.9 (46.2)
Mean minimum °C (°F)	−0.9 (30.4)	−0.8 (30.6)	−0.2 (31.6)	1.1 (34.0)	3.4 (38.1)	6.5 (43.7)	8.9 (48.0)	8.4 (47.1)	6.6 (43.9)	3.6 (38.5)	1.0 (33.8)	−0.7 (30.7)	−2.3 (27.9)
Record low °C (°F)	−7.8 (18.0)	−5.8 (21.6)	−6.0 (21.2)	−3.4 (25.9)	−0.8 (30.6)	1.4 (34.5)	5.3 (41.5)	4.9 (40.8)	1.0 (33.8)	−1.5 (29.3)	−4.0 (24.8)	−7.0 (19.4)	−7.8 (18.0)
Average precipitation mm (inches)	82.5 (3.25)	65.5 (2.58)	62.5 (2.46)	55.1 (2.17)	54.6 (2.15)	62.4 (2.46)	59.1 (2.33)	67.4 (2.65)	70.6 (2.78)	103.3 (4.07)	105.2 (4.14)	95.0 (3.74)	882.9 (34.76)
Average precipitation days (≥ 1.0 mm)	14.2	11.4	10.9	10.0	9.8	9.3	10.2	10.8	11.2	13.4	15.8	14.7	141.8
Mean monthly sunshine hours	54.6	82.8	127.3	181.9	235.3	213.4	203.5	190.2	145.9	105.4	63.9	47.0	1,651.2
Source 1: Met Office
Source 2: Météo Climat, Infoclimat

== Governance ==
The United Kingdom is responsible for the island's defence and ultimately for good governance, and for representing the island in international forums, while the island's own parliament and government have competence over all domestic matters.

=== Political structure ===
The island's parliament, Tynwald, is the oldest continuously governing body in the world, and claimed to have been in continuous existence since 979 or earlier, though evidence supports a later date. Tynwald is a bicameral or tricameral legislature, comprising the House of Keys (directly elected by universal suffrage with a voting age of 16 years) and the Legislative Council (consisting of indirectly elected and ex-officio members). These two bodies also meet together in joint session as Tynwald Court.

The executive branch of government is the Council of Ministers, which is composed of Members of Tynwald (usually Members of the House of Keys, though Members of the Legislative Council may also be appointed as Ministers). It is headed by the Chief Minister.

Vice-regal functions of the head of state are performed by a lieutenant governor.

=== External relations and security ===
In various laws of the United Kingdom, "the United Kingdom" is defined to exclude the Isle of Man. Historically, the UK has taken care of its external and defence affairs and retains paramount power to legislate for the Island. However, in 2007, the Isle of Man and the UK signed an agreement that established frameworks for the development of the international identity of the Isle of Man. There is no separate Manx citizenship. Citizenship is covered by UK law, and Manx people are classed as British citizens. There is a long history of relations and cultural exchange between the Isle of Man and Ireland. The Isle of Man's historic Manx language and its modern revived variant are closely related to both Scottish Gaelic and the Irish language and, in 1947, Éamon de Valera, the Taoiseach of Ireland, spearheaded efforts to save the dying Manx language.

=== Defence ===
The Isle of Man is not part of the United Kingdom; however, the UK is responsible for its defence and external affairs. There are no independent military forces on the Isle of Man, although HMS Ramsey was affiliated with the town of the same name. From 1938 to 1955, there existed the Manx Regiment of the British Territorial Army (TA), which saw extensive action during the Second World War. During the English Civil War, the 7th Earl of Derby, who was also the Lord of Mann, conscripted 10 men from each parish (170 in total) to fight for the Royalist cause; the majority were killed at the Battle of Wigan Lane in 1651. In 1779, the Manx Fencible Corps, a fencible regiment of three companies, was raised; it was disbanded in 1783 at the end of the American War of Independence. Later, the Royal Manx Fencibles was raised at the time of the French Revolutionary Wars and Napoleonic Wars. The 1st Battalion (of 3 companies) was raised in 1793. A 2nd Battalion (of 10 companies) was raised in 1795, and it saw action during the Irish Rebellion of 1798. The regiment was disbanded in 1802. A third body of Manx Fencibles was raised in 1803 to defend the island during the Napoleonic Wars and to assist the Revenue. It was disbanded in 1811. The Isle of Man Home Guard was raised during the Second World War for home defence. In 2015 a multi-capability recruiting and training unit of the British Army Reserve was established in Douglas.

==== Manxman status ====
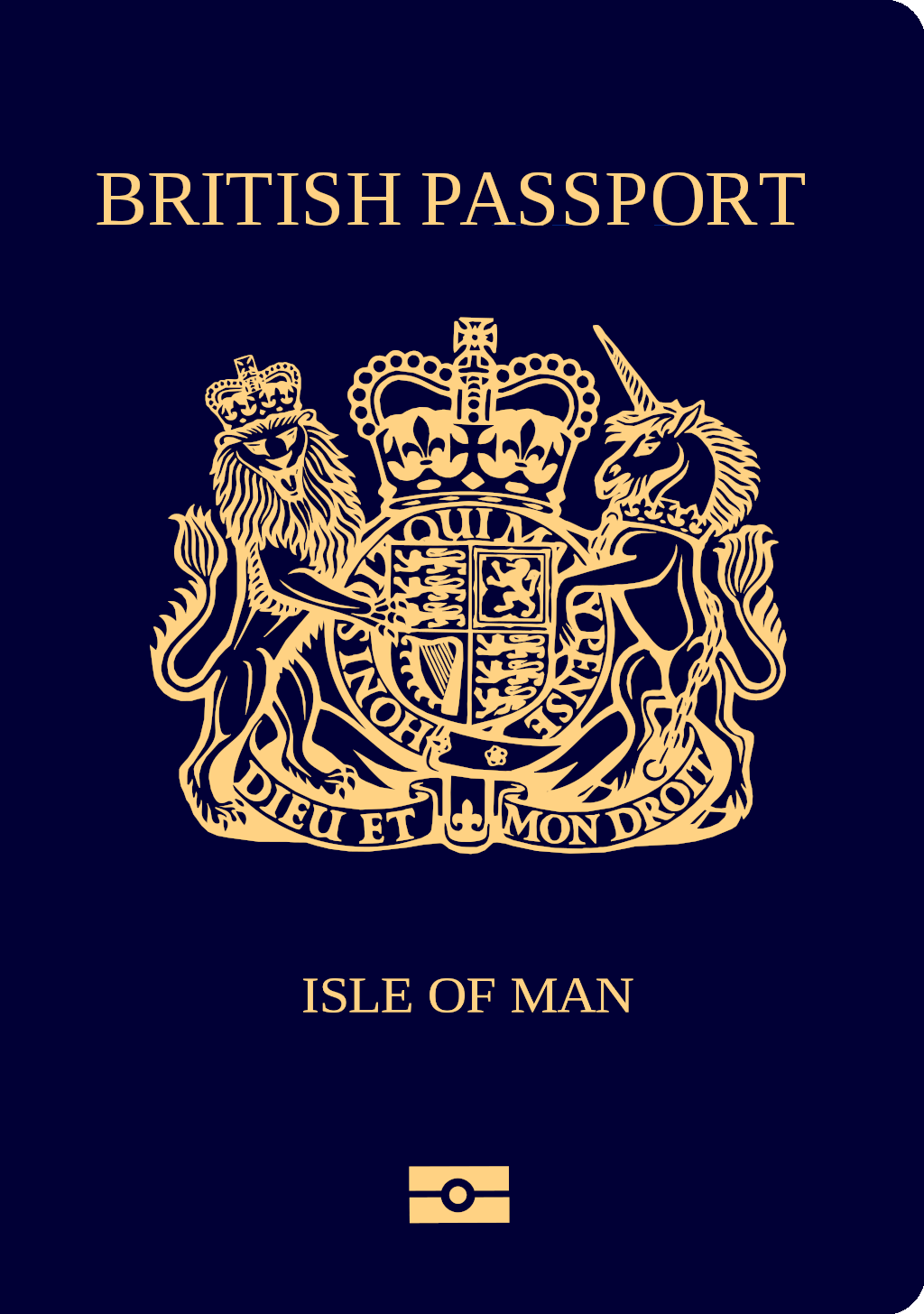
British passport (Isle of Man)

There is no citizenship of the Isle of Man as such; Isle of Man residents are entitled to British citizenship and can obtain a full UK British passport or British Isle of Man passport.

The Passport Office, Isle of Man, Douglas, accepts and processes applications for the Lieutenant Governor of the Isle of Man, who is formally responsible for issuing Isle of Man-issued British passports, titled "British passport – Isle of Man". The powers conferred on the UK Secretary of State by the British Nationality Act 1981 extend to and are exercised in the Isle of Man by the Lieutenant Governor.

Isle of Man-issued British passports can presently be issued to any British citizen resident in the Isle of Man and to British citizens who have a qualifying close personal connection to the Isle of Man but are now resident either in the UK or in either one of the two other Crown Dependencies, the Bailiwick of Jersey or the Bailiwick of Guernsey.

==== European Union ====
The Isle of Man was never part of either the European Economic Community (EEC) or the European Union (EU), nor did it have a special status, and thus it did not take part in the 2016 (Brexit) referendum on the UK's EU membership. However, it was included within the EU's customs area, as part of Protocol 3 of the UK's Act of Accession to the Treaty of Rome, allowing Manx goods to be traded throughout the EU without tariffs.

It was not part of the EU's internal market and there were still limitations on the movement of capital, services and labour.

EU citizens were entitled to travel and reside, but not work, in the island without restriction.

In 2017, the UK confirmed that the Crown Dependencies' positions were included in the Brexit negotiations. The Brexit withdrawal agreement explicitly included the Isle of Man in its territorial scope, but makes no other mention of it.

==== Commonwealth of Nations ====
The Isle of Man is not a member of the Commonwealth of Nations. By virtue of its relationship with the United Kingdom, it takes part in several Commonwealth institutions, including the Commonwealth Parliamentary Association and the Commonwealth Games. The Government of the Isle of Man has made calls for a more integrated relationship with the Commonwealth, including more direct representation and enhanced participation in Commonwealth organisations and meetings, including Commonwealth Heads of Government Meetings. The Chief Minister of the Isle of Man has said: "A closer connection with the Commonwealth itself would be a welcome further development of the island's international relationships."

== Politics ==
Local authorities and sheadings

Most Manx politicians stand for election as independents rather than as representatives of political parties. Although political parties do exist, their influence is not as strong as in the United Kingdom.

There are three political parties in the Isle of Man:

- The Liberal Vannin Party (established 2006) had one seat in the House of Keys until 2026; it promotes greater Manx autonomy and more accountability in government.
- The Manx Labour Party is active and for much of the 20th century had several MHKs. Since the 2021 general election there are two MLP members in the House of Keys, both of whom are women.
- The Isle of Man Green Party was established in 2016, but only has representation at local government level.

There are also a number of pressure groups on the island. Mec Vannin advocate the establishment of a sovereign republic. The Positive Action Group campaign for three key elements to be introduced into the governance of the island: open accountable government, rigorous control of public finances and a fairer society.

=== Local government ===
Local government on the Isle of Man is based partly on the island's 17 ancient parishes. There are four types of local authorities:

- a corporation for the City of Douglas and bodies of commissioners for the town districts of Castletown, Peel and Ramsey
- the districts of Kirk Michael and Onchan
- the village districts of Port Erin and Port St Mary
- the 13 parish districts (those historic parishes, or combinations or parts of them, which do not fall within the districts previously mentioned).

Each of these districts has its own body of commissioners.

=== LGBT rights ===
Same-sex sexual activity was legalised on the island in 1992. In January 2020, the Isle of Man's former Chief Minister Howard Quayle issued an "unqualified apology" to gay men convicted of same-sex offences under previous Manx laws.

== Public services ==
=== Education ===
Public education is overseen by the Department of Education, Sport & Culture. Thirty-two primary schools, five secondary schools and the University College Isle of Man function under the department.

=== Health ===
Two-thirds of residents of Man are overweight or obese, four in ten are physically inactive, one-quarter are binge drinkers, one in twelve smoke cigarettes and about 15% are in poor general health. Healthcare is provided via a public health scheme by the Department of Health and Social Care for residents and visitors from the UK.

=== Crime ===
The Crime Severity Rate in Man, which largely measures crimes directed against persons or property, remains substantially less than that in the United Kingdom, although the rate of violent crime has been increasing in recent years. Most violent crime is associated with the trade in illegal drugs through organised crime groups (OCGs).

The Government of Man has laid out a strategy entailing a "whole-Island approach" to address the serious problems of money laundering, financial crime and terrorism financing.

=== Emergency services ===
The Isle of Man Government maintains five emergency services. These are:

- Isle of Man Constabulary (police)
- Isle of Man Coastguard
- Isle of Man Fire and Rescue Service
- Isle of Man Ambulance Service
- Isle of Man Civil Defence Corps

All of these services are controlled directly by the Department of Home Affairs of the Isle of Man Government and are independent of the United Kingdom. Nonetheless, the Isle of Man Constabulary voluntarily submits to inspection by the British inspectorate of police, and the Isle of Man Coastguard contracts His Majesty's Coastguard (UK) for air-sea rescue operations.

=== Crematorium ===
The island's sole crematorium is located in Glencrutchery Road, Douglas, and operated by the Douglas Borough Council. Usually staffed by four, in March 2020 an increase of staff to 12 was announced by the Council leader, responding to the threat of the COVID-19 pandemic, which could require more staff.

== Economy ==
The Isle of Man has no capital gains tax, wealth tax, stamp duty, or inheritance tax and a top rate of income tax of 22% (as of April 2024). A tax cap is in force: the maximum amount of tax payable by an individual is £200,000 or £400,000 for couples choosing to have their incomes jointly assessed. Personal income is assessed and taxed on a worldwide income basis rather than a remittance basis. This means that all income earned throughout the world is assessable for Manx tax rather than only income earned in or brought into the island. The standard rate of corporation tax for residents and non-residents is 0%. Retail business profits above £500,000 and banking business income are taxed at 10%, while rental (or other) income from land and buildings situated on the Isle of Man is taxed at 20%.

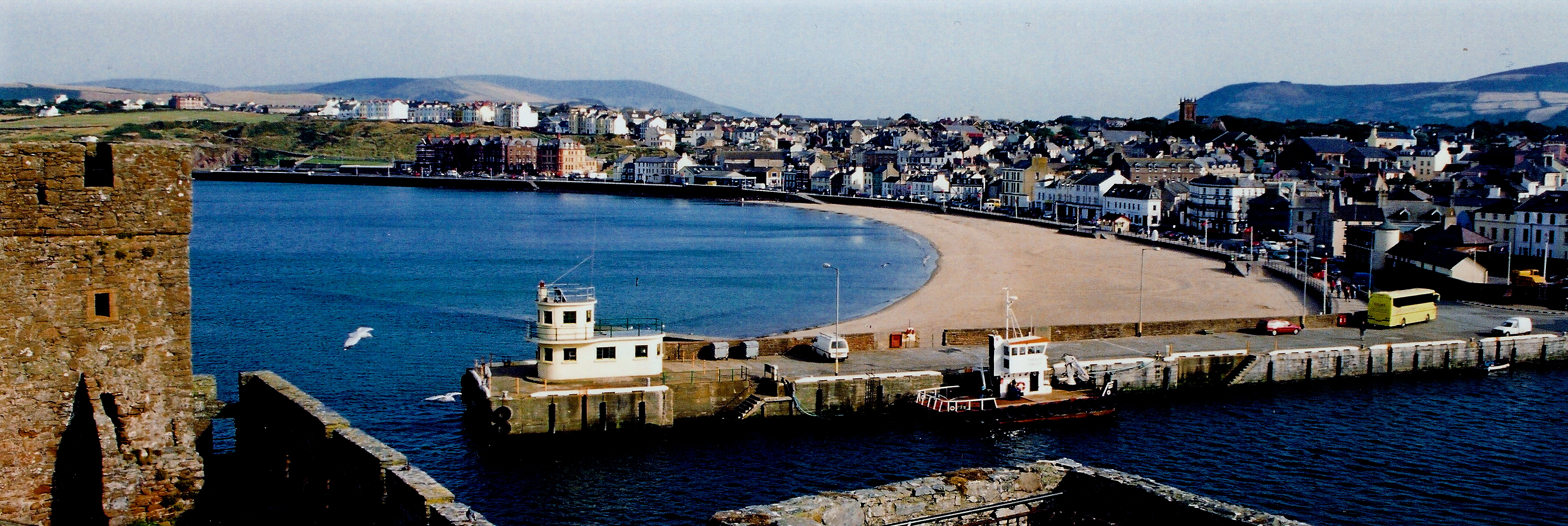
Peel is the island's main fishing port.

Man's low corporate tax burden and absence of public registries of corporate ownership provides tax avoidance and tax evasion strategies for individuals and corporations; this results in a large influx of funds from those in pursuit of tax advantage and financial confidentiality. The relative importance of agriculture, fishing and tourism in the Isle of Man, the former mainstays of the economy, has accordingly declined. As is typical of the low-tax crown dependencies, Man's economy features financial services, shell corporations for high-technology companies, online gambling and online gaming, cinema production and tax havens for high net worth individuals. These activities have brought some high-income jobs to Man, as hundreds of local residents serve as "straw man" directors and shareholders of shell companies. Similar schemes provide a means for high net worth individuals to reduce their tax obligations and to shield their financial dealings from public scrutiny. As described in the Paradise Papers, the Isle of Man economy features extensive illegal economic activity including tax evasion, money laundering from drug sales, money transfers from weapons sales, and looting of public treasuries of other nation states (particularly Russia). These funds are mostly funnelled into the London financial markets. Online gambling sites provided about 10% of the Manx government's revenue in 2014.

There has been an effort to regulate these illicit activities on Man, though the impact of legal measures instituted by the Man government remains uncertain. As of June 2023, Man remains out of compliance with standards for Anti-Money Laundering & Countering the Financing of Terrorism requirements according to Moneyval, the European Union's Committee of Experts on the Evaluation of Anti-Money Laundering Measures and the Financing of Terrorism.

The Isle of Man Department for Enterprise manages the diversified economy in 12 key sectors. The largest sectors by GNP are insurance and online casino operations with 17% of GNP each, followed by ICT and banking with 9% each. The 2016 census lists 41,636 total employed. The largest sectors by employment are "medical and health", "financial and business services", construction, retail and public administration. Manufacturing, focused on aerospace and the food and drink industry, employs almost 2000 workers and contributes about 5% of gross domestic product (GDP). The sector provides laser optics, industrial diamonds, electronics, plastics and aerospace precision engineering. Tourism, agriculture and fishing, once the mainstays of the economy, now make very little contributions to the island's GDP. The unemployment rate on Man is less than 1%.

International trade

Trade takes place mostly with the United Kingdom. The island is in customs union with the UK, and related revenues are pooled and shared under the Common Purse Agreement. This means that the Isle of Man cannot have the lower excise revenues on alcohol and other goods that are enjoyed in the Channel Islands.

Cinematics

The Manx government promotes island locations for making films by offering financial support. Since 1995, over 100 films have been made on the island. Most recently the island has taken a much wider strategy to attract the general digital media industry in film, television, video and esports.

Lottery

The Isle of Man Government Lottery operated from 1986 to 1997. Since 2 December 1999 the island has participated in the United Kingdom National Lottery. The island is the only jurisdiction outside the United Kingdom where it is possible to play the UK National Lottery. Since 2010 it has also been possible for projects in the Isle of Man to receive national lottery Good Causes Funding. The good causes funding is distributed by the Manx Lottery Trust. Tynwald receives the 12% lottery duty for tickets sold in the island.

Motorcycle racing

The Isle of Man TT and Manx GP are major events of the island, bringing in tens of thousands of visitors, mostly travelling on motorcycles.

Both events last two weeks and are a huge economic peaktime for hotels, campsites, restaurants, souvenir shops, bars and the Isle of Man Steam Packet Company ferry. Prices for accommodation soar in race weeks. The Isle of Man governmental Department of Enterprise is official organizer of both events.

In 2025 almost 40,000 tourists came to the island for the largest of both events, the TT, spending over £ 50 million pound.

The 2024 Manx Grand Prix attracted 14,229 visitors to the island, but the organising Department for Enterprise recently invested to grow that audience.

Tourism

Tourist numbers peaked in the first half of the 20th century, prior to the boom in cheap travel to Southern Europe that also saw the decline of tourism in many similar English seaside resorts. The Isle of Man tourism board has recently invested in "Dark Sky Discovery" sites to diversify its tourism industry. It is expected that dark skies will generally be nominated by the public across the UK. However, the Isle of Man tourism board tasked someone from their team to nominate 27 places on the island as a civil task. This cluster of the highest quality "Milky Way" sites is now well promoted within the island. This government push has effectively given the island a head start in the number of recognised Dark Sky sites. However, this has created a distorted view when compared to the UK where this is not promoted on a national scale. There, Dark Sky sites are expected to be nominated over time by the public across a full range of town, city and countryside locations rather than en masse by government departments.

Stock exchange

In 2017 an office of The International Stock Exchange was opened to provide a boost for the island's finance industry.

=== Communications ===
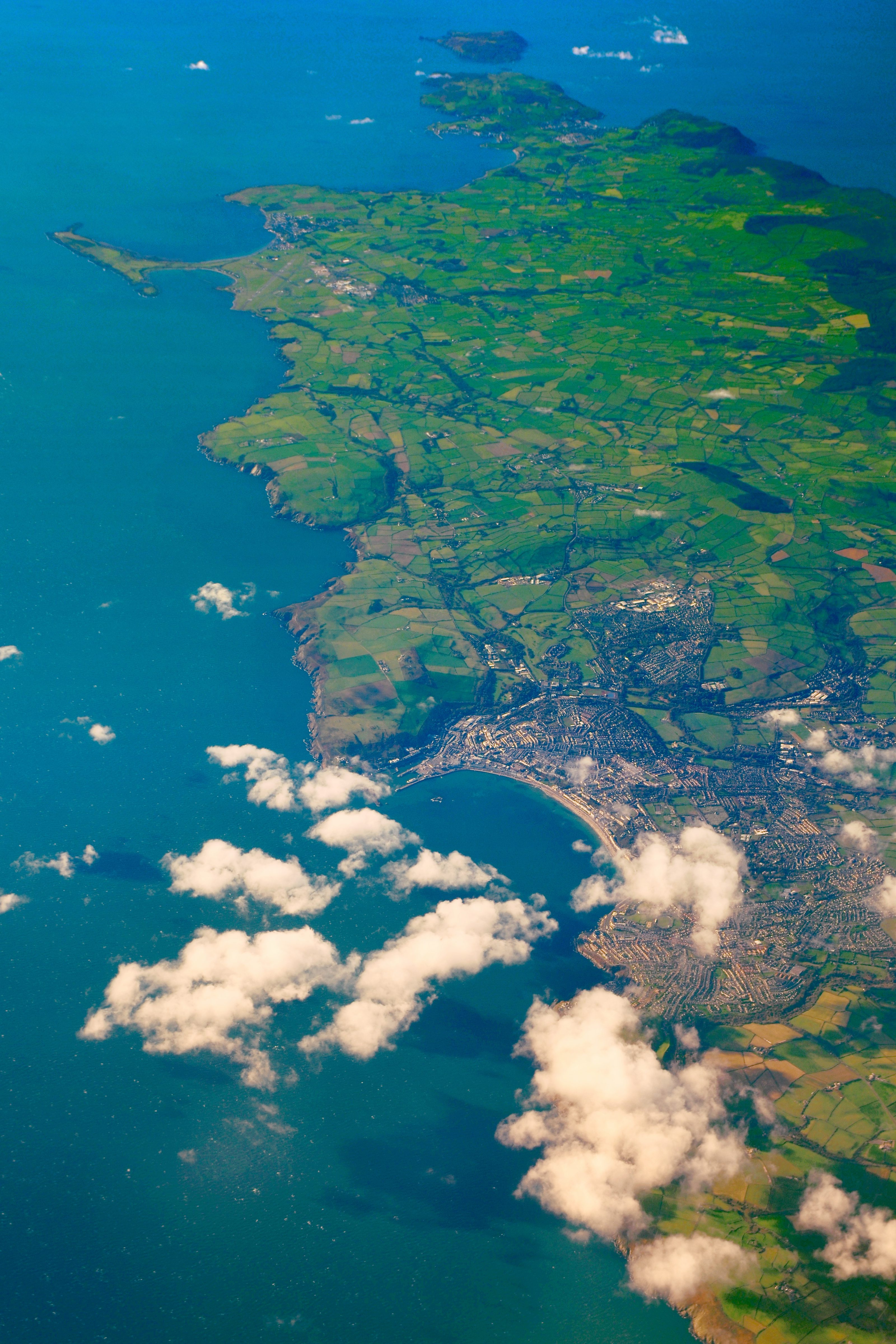
Aerial view of Douglas and the southern half of the Isle of Man

The main telephone provider on the Isle of Man is Manx Telecom. The island has two mobile operators: Manx Telecom, previously known as Manx Pronto, and Sure. Cloud9 operated as a third mobile operator on the island for a short time but has since withdrawn.

Broadband internet services are available through four local providers: Wi-Manx, Domicilium, Manx Computer Bureau and Manx Telecom, non-local offerings have begun to offer coverage with recent investment from Starlink which is available island wide. The island does not have its own ITU country code but is accessed via the British country code (+44). Telephone numbers are part of the British telephone numbering plan, with local dialling codes 01624 for landlines and 07524, 07624 and 07924 for mobiles. Calls to the island from the UK, however, are generally charged differently from those within the UK and may or may not be included in any "inclusive minutes" packages.

In 1996, the Isle of Man Government obtained permission to use the .im national top-level domain (TLD) and has ultimate responsibility for its use. The domain is managed from day to day by Domicilium, an island-based internet service provider. In December 2007, the Manx Electricity Authority and its telecommunications subsidiary, e-llan Communications, commissioned the laying of a new fibre-optic link that connects the island to a worldwide fibre-optic network. In August 2021 it was reported that Elon Musk's satellite internet service, Starlink, had been granted a licence to operate from a ground station on the island.

The Isle of Man has three radio stations: Manx Radio, Energy FM and 3FM.

There is no insular television service, but local transmitters retransmit British mainland digital broadcasts via the free-to-air digital terrestrial service Freeview. The Isle of Man is served by BBC North West for BBC One and BBC Two television services, and ITV Granada for ITV.

Many television services are available by satellite, such as Sky and Freesat from the group of satellites at 28.2° East, as well as services from a range of other satellites around Europe such as the Astra satellites at 19.2° east and Hot Bird.

The Isle of Man has three newspapers, all weeklies and owned by Media Isle of Man, formerly Isle of Man Newspapers, a division of the media company The Tindle Group. The Isle of Man Courier (distribution 36,318) is free and distributed to homes on the island. The other two newspapers are Isle of Man Examiner (circulation 13,276) and the Manx Independent (circulation 12,255).

Postal services are the responsibility of the Isle of Man Post Office, which took over from the UK's General Post Office in 1973. Independent postal services such as DHL, FedEx and Hermes Europe are also present.

=== Transport ===
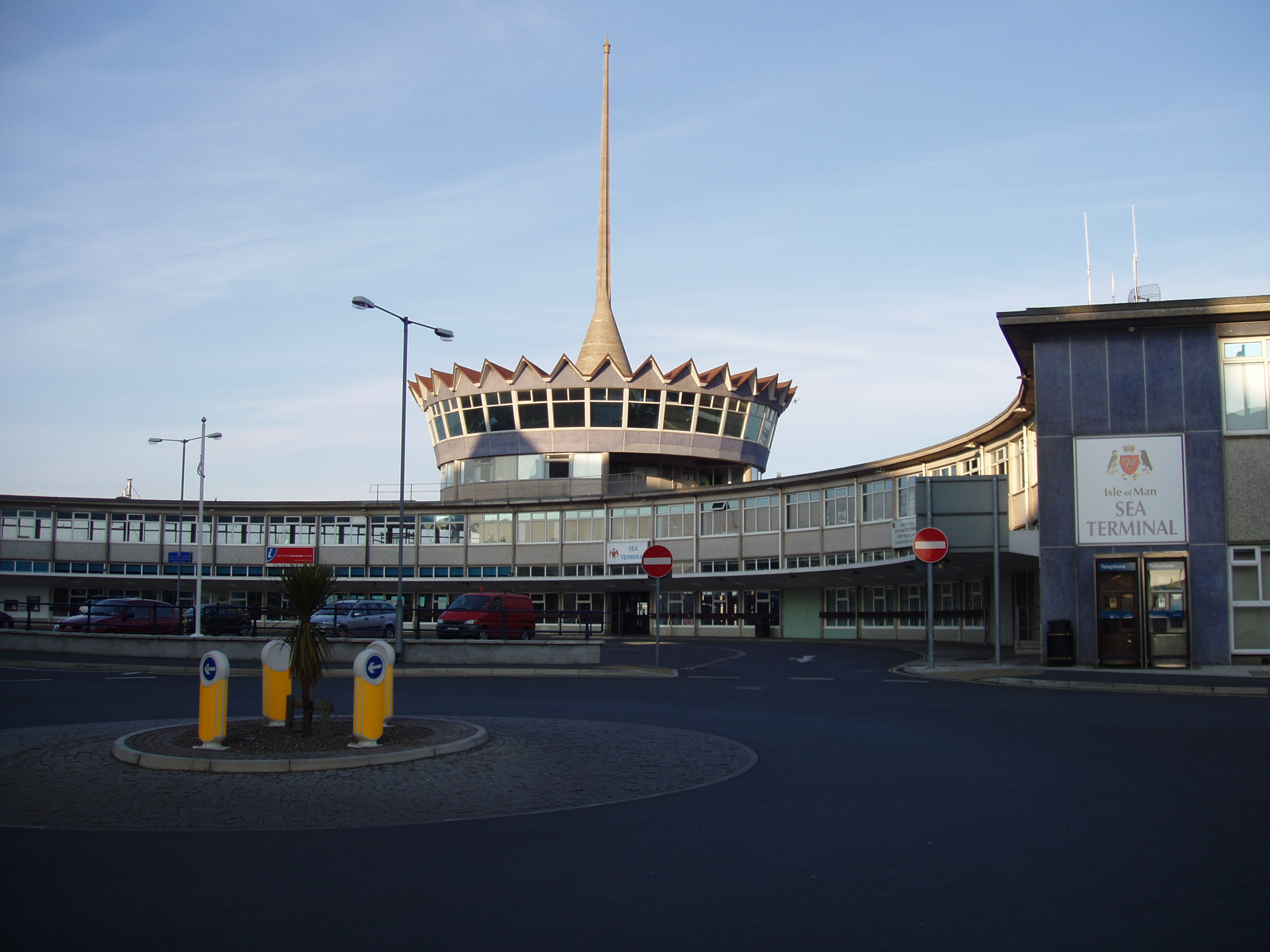
Sea Terminal front façade

There is a comprehensive bus network, operated by the government-owned bus operator Bus Vannin.

The Isle of Man Sea Terminal in Douglas has regular ferries to and from Heysham and to and from Liverpool, with a more restricted timetable operating in winter. The two vessels are Manannan and Manxman. The latter, named by the public in mid 2020 and built by Hyundai, arrived in 2023 and soon had largely taken over from the Ben My Chree. There are also limited summer-only services to and from Belfast and Dublin. The Dublin route also operates at Christmas. At the time of the Isle of Man TT a limited number of sailings operate to and from Larne in Northern Ireland. All ferries are operated by the Isle of Man Steam Packet Company.

The only commercial airport on the island is the Isle of Man Airport at Ronaldsway. There are direct scheduled and chartered flights to numerous airports in the United Kingdom and Ireland.

The island has a total of 688 miles (1,107 km) of public roads, all of which are paved. There is no overriding national speed limit; only local speed limits are set, and some roads have no speed limit. Rules about reckless driving and most other driving regulations are enforced in a similar way to the UK. There is a requirement for regular vehicle examinations for new or imported vehicles (similar to the MOT test in the UK).

The island used to have an extensive narrow-gauge railway system, both steam-operated and electric, but the majority of the steam railway tracks were taken out of service many years ago and the track removed. As of 2023, there is a steam railway between Douglas and Port Erin, an electric railway between Douglas and Ramsey and an electric mountain railway which climbs Snaefell.

One of the oldest operating horse tram services is located on the sea front in the capital, Douglas. It was founded in 1876.

=== Space commerce ===
The Isle of Man has become a centre for emerging private space travel companies. A number of the competitors in the Google Lunar X Prize, a $30 million competition for the first privately funded team to send a robot to the Moon, are based on the island. The team summit for the X Prize was held on the island in October 2010. In January 2011 two research space stations owned by Excalibur Almaz arrived on the island and were kept in an aircraft hangar at the airfield at the former RAF Jurby near Jurby.

=== Electricity supply ===
The electricity supply on the Isle of Man is run by the Manx Utilities Authority. The Isle of Man is connected to Great Britain's national grid by a 40 MW alternating current link (Isle of Man to England Interconnector). There are also hydroelectric, natural gas and diesel generators. The government has also planned a 700 MW offshore wind farm, roughly half the size of Walney Wind Farm.

=== Gas supply ===
Gas for lighting and heating has been supplied to users on the Isle of Man since 1836, firstly as town gas, then as liquefied petroleum gas (LPG); since 2003 natural gas has been available. The future use of hydrogen as a supplementary or substitute fuel is being studied.

=== Cannabis cultivation ===
In June 2021, the law prohibiting commercial cultivation of cannabis on the Isle of Man was repealed, and the government of Man, for the first time, offered licences for production and export of cannabis. In February 2022, Man resident and local billionaire John Whittaker, through his firm Peel NRE, proposed to spend US$136 million for the construction of warmhouses for cannabis cultivation and research facilities, and to develop the business. It was announced that zoning permits had been granted for development of the facility. Although the availability of medical cannabis is heavily restricted within the UK, there has been an effort to develop the cannabis industry on the Channel Islands of Jersey and Guernsey.

== Culture ==
The Manx are a Celtic nation.

The culture of the Isle of Man is often promoted as being influenced by its Celtic and, to a lesser extent, its Norse origins. Proximity to the UK, popularity as a UK tourist destination in Victorian times and immigration from Britain have all meant that the cultures of Great Britain have been influential at least since Revestment. Revival campaigns have attempted to preserve the surviving vestiges of Manx culture after a long period of Anglicisation, and there has been significantly increased interest in the Manx language, history and musical tradition.

=== Language ===
- Person: Manxie; Manxman, -woman (Manninagh)
- People: Manx (Manninee)
- Language: Manx (Manninish; Gaelg, Gailck; Ghlare Vanninagh); BSL (Glare Chowree)
- Country: Isle of Man (Mannin, Ellan Vannin)

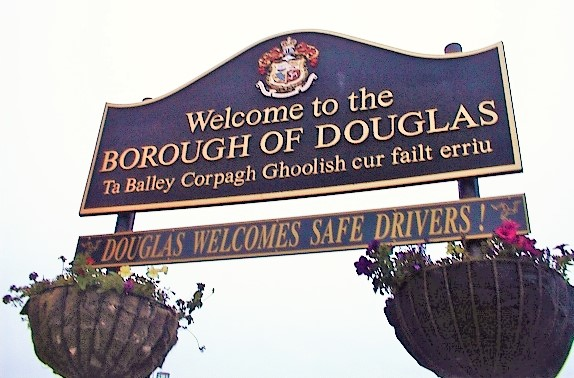
A bilingual sign in the Isle of Man featuring Manx and English

The official languages of the Isle of Man are English and Manx. Manx has traditionally been spoken but has been stated to be "critically endangered". However, it now has a growing number of young speakers. It is increasingly evident on the island: for instance, in public notices and its increasing use in the Tynwald ceremony.

Manx is a Goidelic Celtic language and is one of a number of insular Celtic languages spoken in the British Isles. Manx has been officially recognised as a legitimate autochthonous regional language under the European Charter for Regional or Minority Languages, ratified by the United Kingdom on 27 March 2001 on behalf of the Isle of Man government.

Manx is closely related to Irish and Scottish Gaelic but is orthographically sui generis.

On the island, the Manx greetings moghrey mie (good morning) and fastyr mie (good afternoon) can often be heard. As in Irish and Scottish Gaelic, the concepts of "evening" and "afternoon" are referred to with one word. Two other Manx expressions often heard are Gura mie eu ("Thank you"; familiar 2nd person singular form Gura mie ayd) and traa dy liooar, meaning "time enough", which represents a stereotypical view of the Manx attitude to life.

In the 2011 Isle of Man census, approximately 1,800 residents stated that they could read, write and speak the Manx language.

=== Symbols ===
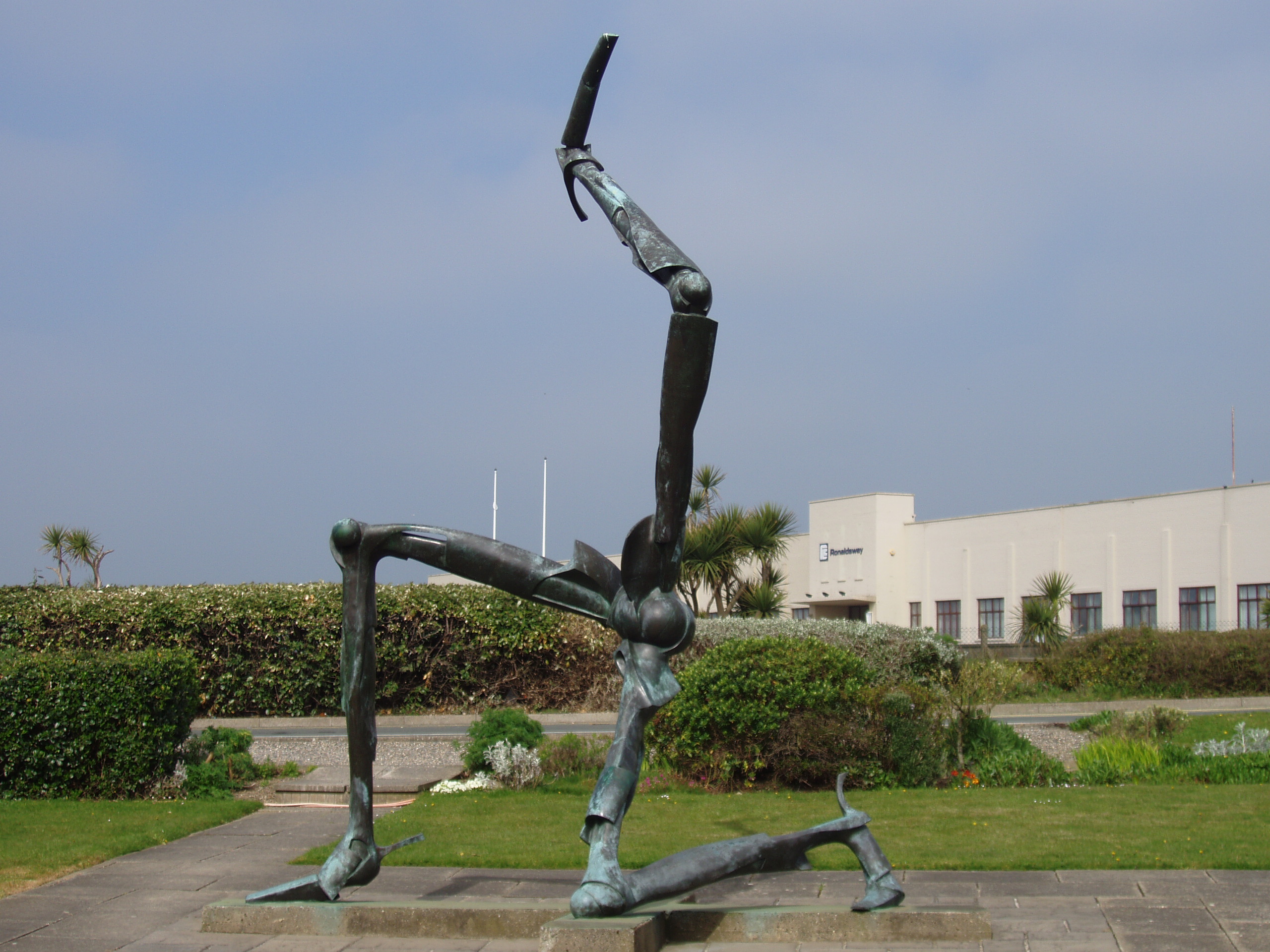
A sculpture of the Manx triskelion in front of Ronaldsway Airport terminal

For centuries, the island's symbol has been the so-called "three legs of Man" (Manx: Tree Cassyn Vannin), a triskelion of three legs conjoined at the thigh. The Manx triskelion, which dates back with certainty to the late 13th century, is of uncertain origin. It has been suggested that its origin lies in Sicily, an island which has been associated with the triskelion since ancient times. The two islands' symbols could be related via the Norman rulers of Sicily: the Hauteville family.

The symbol appears in the island's official flag and official coat of arms, as well as its currency. The Manx triskelion may be reflected in the island's motto, Quocunque jeceris stabit, which appears as part of the island's coat of arms. The Latin motto translates as "whichever way you throw, it will stand" or "whithersoever you throw it, it will stand". It dates to the late 17th century when it is known to have appeared on the island's coinage. It may be understood to refer to the caltrop, a military device with one spike always pointing upwards. The motto itself originally featured on the family badge of the Byzantine/Roman General Flavius Belisarius (505 – 565 AD) along with a representation of a caltrop. It has also been suggested that the motto originally referred to the poor quality of coinage which was common at the time—as in "however it is tested it will pass".

The ragwort or cushag has been referred to as the Manx national flower.

=== Religion ===
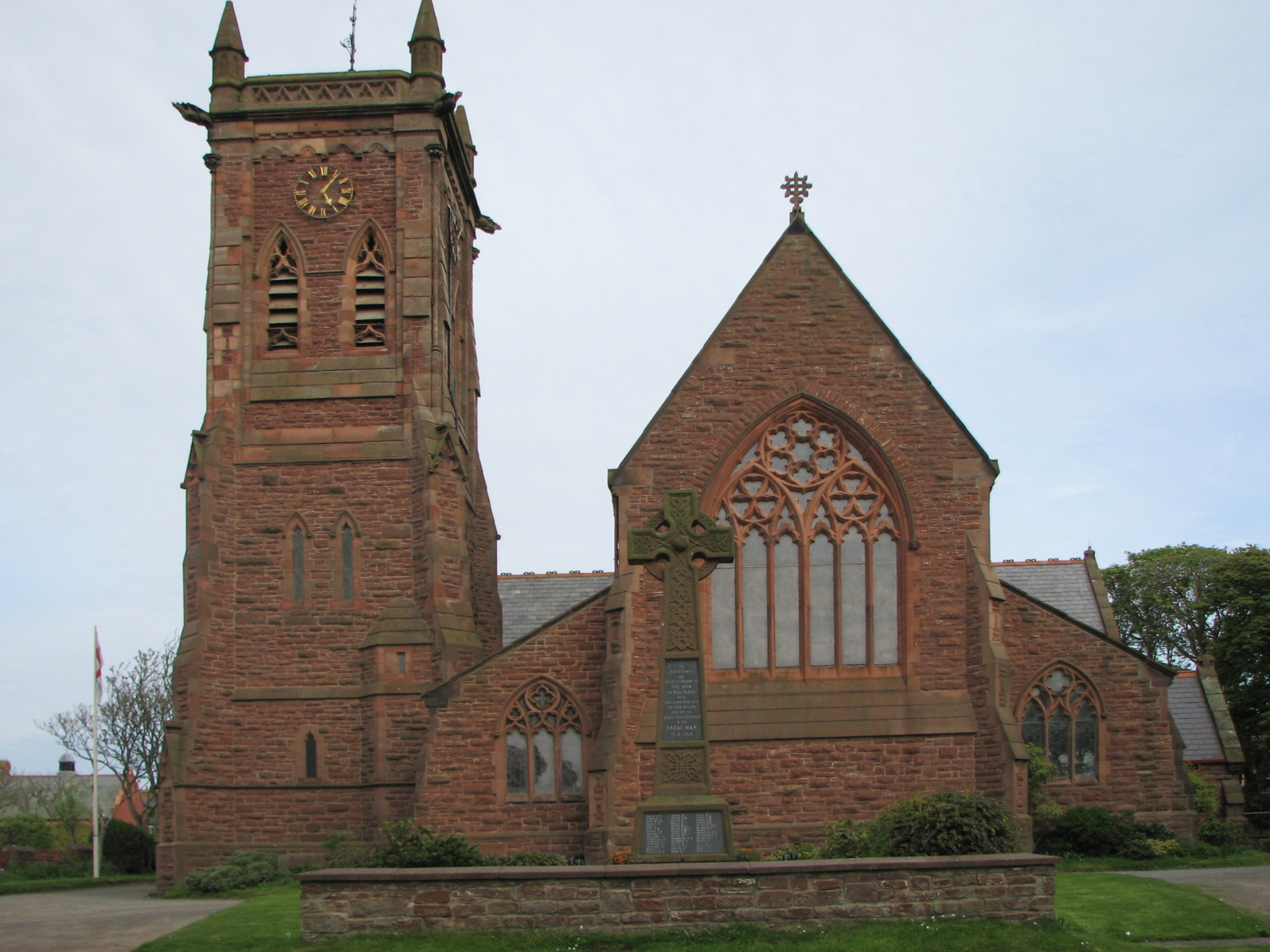
Peel Cathedral

The predominant religious tradition of the Isle of Man is Christianity, adhered to by 54.7% of the Manx according to the 2021 census. At the same time, 43.8% of the population had no religion, 0.5% adhered to Islam, 0.5% to Buddhism, 0.4% to Hinduism, 0.2% to Judaism and 0.2% to other religions.

Before the Protestant Reformation, the island had a long history as part of the unified Catholic Church. In the years following the Reformation, the religious authorities on the island, and later the population of the island, accepted the religious authority of the British monarchy, Anglicanism and the Church of England. The Isle of Man also came under the influence of Irish religious tradition. The island forms a separate diocese called Sodor and Man, which in the distant past comprised the medieval kingdom of Man and the Scottish isles ("Suðreyjar" in Old Norse). Nowadays, it consists of sixteen parishes, and since 1541 has been part of the Province of York.

Other Christian denominations and other religions also operate on the Isle of Man. The second largest denomination is the Methodist Church, whose Isle of Man District is close in numbers to the Anglican diocese. Then, there are eight Catholic parish churches, included in the Catholic Archdiocese of Liverpool, as well as a presence of Eastern Orthodox Christians. Additionally, there are five Baptist churches, four Pentecostal churches, the Salvation Army, a ward of the Church of Jesus Christ of Latter-day Saints, two congregations of Jehovah's Witnesses, two United Reformed churches, as well as other Christian churches.

The Manx Muslim community has a mosque in Douglas, while Jews also have a history on the island. In 2022, the island's first Buddhist temple was established in Baldrine.

=== Myth, legend and folklore ===
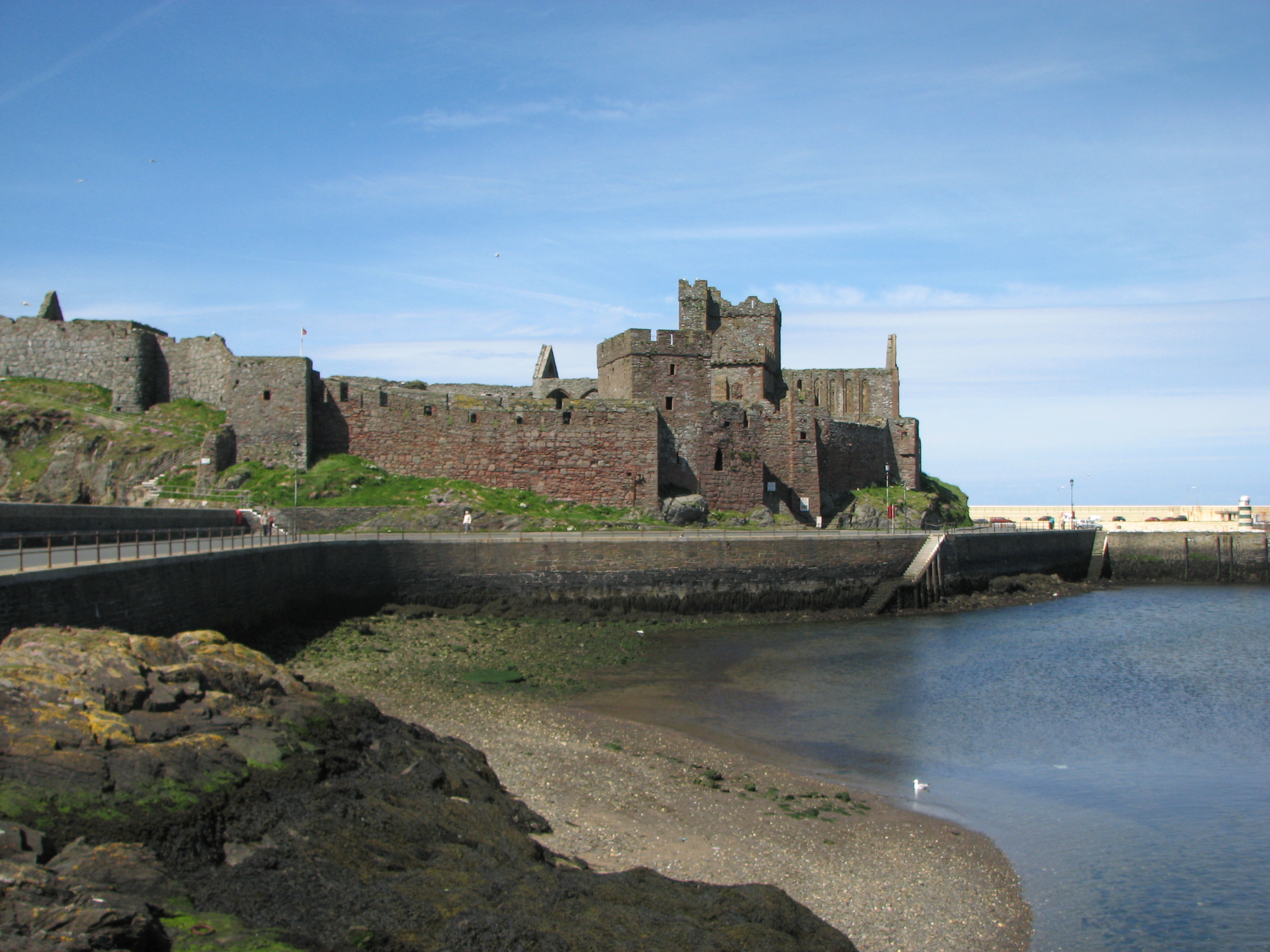
Peel Castle

In Manx mythology, the island was ruled by the sea god Manannán, who would draw his misty cloak around the island to protect it from invaders. One of the principal folk theories about the origin of the name Man is that it is named after Manannán.

In the Manx tradition of folklore, there are many stories of mythical creatures and characters. These include the Buggane, a malevolent spirit which according to legend, blew the roof off St Trinian's Church in a fit of rage; the Fenodyree; the Glashtyn; and the Moddey Dhoo, a ghostly black dog which wandered the walls and corridors of Peel Castle.

The Isle of Man is also said to be home to fairies, known locally as "the little folk" or "themselves". There is a famous Fairy Bridge, and it is said to be bad luck if one fails to wish the fairies good morning or afternoon when passing over it. It used to be a tradition to leave a coin on the bridge to ensure good luck. Other types of fairies include the Arkan Sonney.

An old Irish story tells how Lough Neagh was formed when Ireland's legendary giant Fionn mac Cumhaill (commonly anglicised to Finn McCool) ripped up a portion of the land and tossed it at a Scottish rival. He missed and the chunk of earth landed in the Irish Sea, thus creating the island.

Peel Castle has been proposed as a possible location of the Arthurian Avalon or as the location of the Grail Castle, site of Lancelot's encounter with the sword bridge of King Maleagant.

One of the most oft-repeated myths is that people found guilty of witchcraft were rolled down Slieau Whallian, a hill near St John's, in a barrel. However, this is a 19th-century legend derived from a Scottish legend, which in turn comes from a German legend. Separately, a witchcraft museum was opened at the Witches Mill, Castletown in 1951, despite there never being a witches' coven on that site; the myth was only created with the opening of the museum. However, there has been a strong tradition of herbalism and the use of charms to prevent and cure illness and disease in people and animals.

=== Music ===
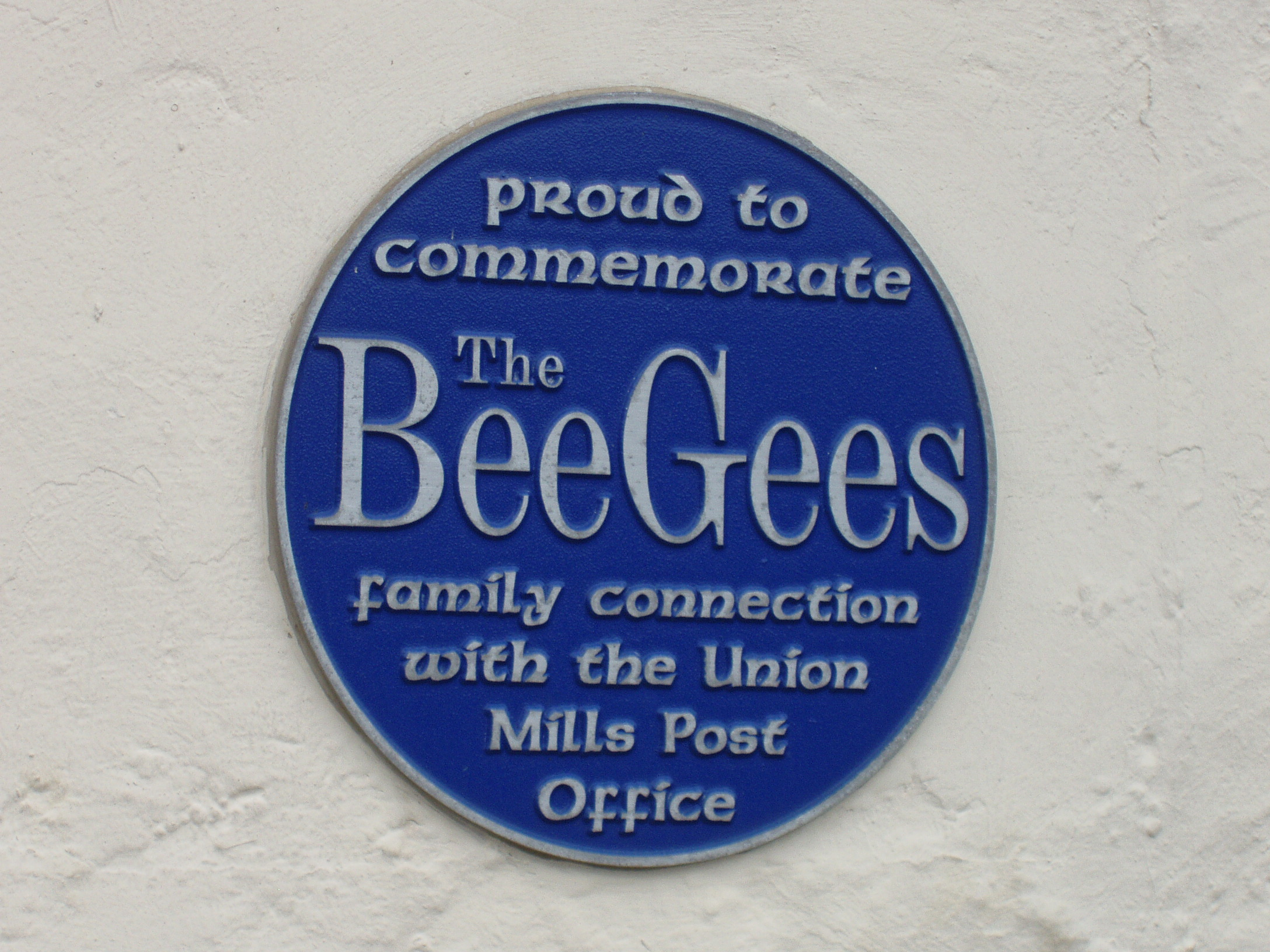
Bee Gees plaque at Maitland Terrace/Strang Road intersection in Union Mills, Isle of Man

The music of the Isle of Man reflects Celtic, Norse and other influences, including from its neighbours, Scotland, Ireland, England and Wales. A wide range of music is performed on the island, such as rock, blues, jazz and pop.

Its traditional folk music has undergone a revival since the 1970s, starting with a music festival called Yn Chruinnaght in Ramsey. This was part of a general revival of the Manx language and culture after the death of the last native speaker of Manx in 1974.

Orchestral and song composer Haydn Wood grew up on the Isle of Man, moving there in 1885, aged three years old. The island and its folk tunes inspired Wood's music, resulting in the compositions Manx Rhapsody (Mylecharaine), Manx Countryside Sketches, Manx Overture, and the 1933 tone poem Mannin Veen (Manx for "Dear Isle of Man"), based on four Manx folk tunes and scored for wind band. His older brother Harry Wood (1868–1939) was also a musician: a violinist, composer and conductor who became known as "Manxland's King of Music".

The Isle of Man is mentioned in the Who song "Happy Jack" as the homeland of the song's titular character, who is always in a state of ecstasy, no matter what happens to him. The song "The Craic was 90 in the Isle of Man" by Christy Moore describes a lively visit during the Island's tourism heyday. The Island is also the birthplace of Maurice, Robin and Barry Gibb, of the Bee Gees; a bronze statue of the trio was unveiled on Douglas promenade in July 2021.

=== Food ===
In the past, the basic national dish of the island was spuds and herrin, boiled potatoes and herring. This plain dish was supported by the subsistence farmers of the island, who for centuries crofted the land and fished the sea. A more recent claimant for the title of national dish is the ubiquitous chips, cheese and gravy, which is found in most of the island's fast-food outlets. It consists of thick-cut chips, covered in shredded Cheddar cheese and topped with a thick gravy. However, as of the Isle of Man Food & Drink Festival 2018, queen scallops (queenies) have been crowned the Manx national dish with many restaurants, hotels and pubs serving local wild queen scallops.

Seafood has traditionally accounted for a large proportion of the local diet. Although commercial fishing has declined in recent years, local delicacies include Manx kippers (smoked herrings) which are produced by the smokeries in Peel on the west coast of the island, albeit mainly from North Sea herring these days. The smokeries also produce other specialities including smoked salmon and bacon.

Crab, lobster and scallops are commercially fished; further, the queen scallop is regarded as a particular delicacy, with a light, sweet flavour. Cod, ling and mackerel are often angled for the table, and freshwater trout and salmon can be taken from the local rivers and lakes, supported by the government fish hatchery at Cornaa on the east coast.

Cattle, sheep, pigs and poultry are all commercially farmed; Manx lamb from the hill farms is a popular dish. The Loaghtan, the indigenous breed of Manx sheep, has a rich, dark meat that has found favour with chefs, featuring in dishes on the BBC's MasterChef series.

Manx cheese has also found some success, featuring smoked and herb-flavoured varieties, and is stocked by many of the UK's supermarket chains. Manx cheese took bronze medals in the 2005 British Cheese Awards and sold 578 tonnes over the year. Manx cheddar has been exported to Canada where it is available in some supermarkets.

Beer is brewed on a commercial scale by Okells Brewery, which was established in 1850 and is the island's largest brewer. Other breweries include Bushy's Brewery, Hooded Ram, Odin, Radical Brewing, Noa Brewhouse and Kaneens Brewery. The Isle of Man's Brewers' Act 1874, which resembles the German Reinheitsgebot, is still in effect: under this Act, brewers may only use water, malt, sugar and hops in their brews.

=== Sport ===
The Isle of Man is represented as a nation in the Commonwealth Games and the Island Games and hosted the IV Commonwealth Youth Games in 2011. Manx athletes have won three gold medals at the Commonwealth Games, including the one by cyclist Mark Cavendish in 2006 in the Scratch race. The Island Games were first held on the island in 1985 and again in 2001. FC Isle of Man was founded in 2019 and is a North West Counties League team.

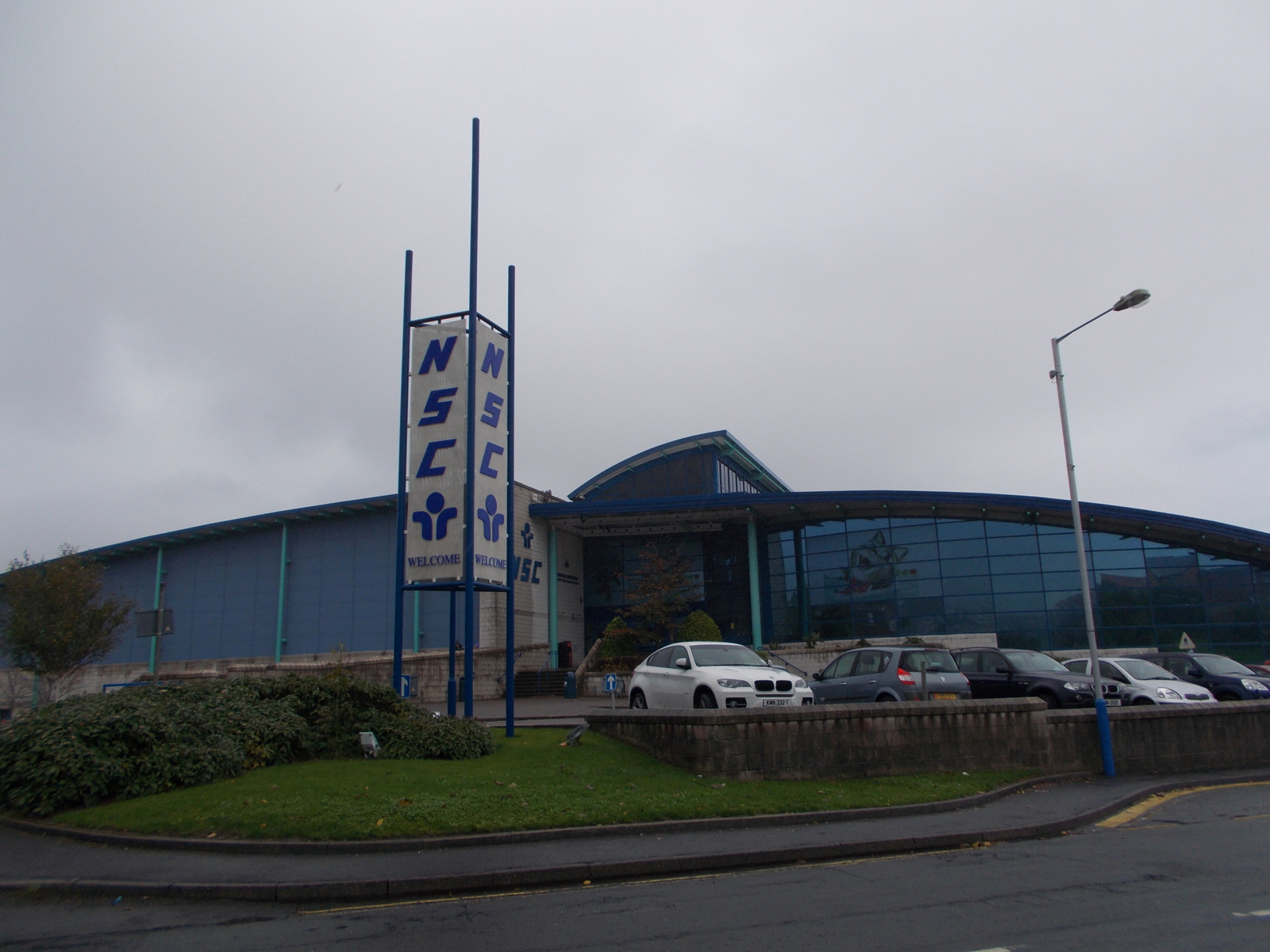
The National Sports Centre, Douglas, Isle of Man

Isle of Man teams and individuals participate in many sports both on and off the island including rugby union, football, gymnastics, field hockey, netball, taekwondo, bowling, obstacle course racing and cricket. The FC Isle of Man compete in the North West Counties Football League Premier Division. It being an island, many types of watersports are also popular with residents.

==== Motorcycle racing ====
The main international event associated with the island is the Isle of Man Tourist Trophy race, colloquially known as "The TT", which began in 1907. It takes place in late May and early June. The TT is now an international road racing event for motorcycles, which used to be part of the World Championship, and is long considered to be one of the "greatest motorcycle sporting events of the world". Taking place over a two-week period, it has become a festival for motorcycling culture, makes a huge contribution to the island's economy and has become part of Manx identity. In 2023, Peter Hickman, an English professional racer, set the time trial record for the 37.73-mile track, averaging 136.35mph for the duration of his lap. Feats like this cement the Isle in the minds of many to carry the title "Road Racing Capital of the World".

The Manx Grand Prix is a separate motorcycle event for amateurs and private entrants that uses the same 60.70 km (37.72 mi) Snaefell Mountain Course in late August and early September.

==== Cammag ====
Prior to the introduction of football in the 19th century, cammag was the island's traditional sport. It is similar to the Irish hurling and the Scottish game of shinty. Nowadays there is an annual match at St John's.

=== Theatre and cinema ===
Built in 1899, to the designs of architect Frank Matcham, and restored in 1976 to its original splendour, the government-owned Gaiety Theatre and Opera House on the Douglas Promenade presents plays, musicals, concerts and comedy shows year-round. Within the Gaiety Theatre Complex, the Broadway Cinema has a capacity of 154 and doubles as a conference venue.

The Palace Cinema is located next to the derelict Castle Mona hotel and is operated by the Sefton Group. It has two screens: Screen One holds 293 customers, while Screen Two is smaller with a capacity of just 95. It was extensively refurbished in August 2011.

=== Fauna ===
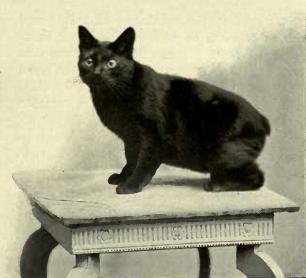
Manx cat

Two domestic animals are specifically connected to the Isle of Man, though they are also found elsewhere.

The Manx cat is a breed of cat noted for its genetic mutation resulting in a shortened tail. The length of this tail can range from a few inches, known as a "stumpy", to being completely nonexistent, or "rumpy". Manx cats display a range of colours and usually have somewhat longer hind legs compared to most cats. The cats have been used as a symbol of the Isle of Man on coins and stamps; and at one time the Manx government operated a breeding centre to ensure the continuation of the breed.

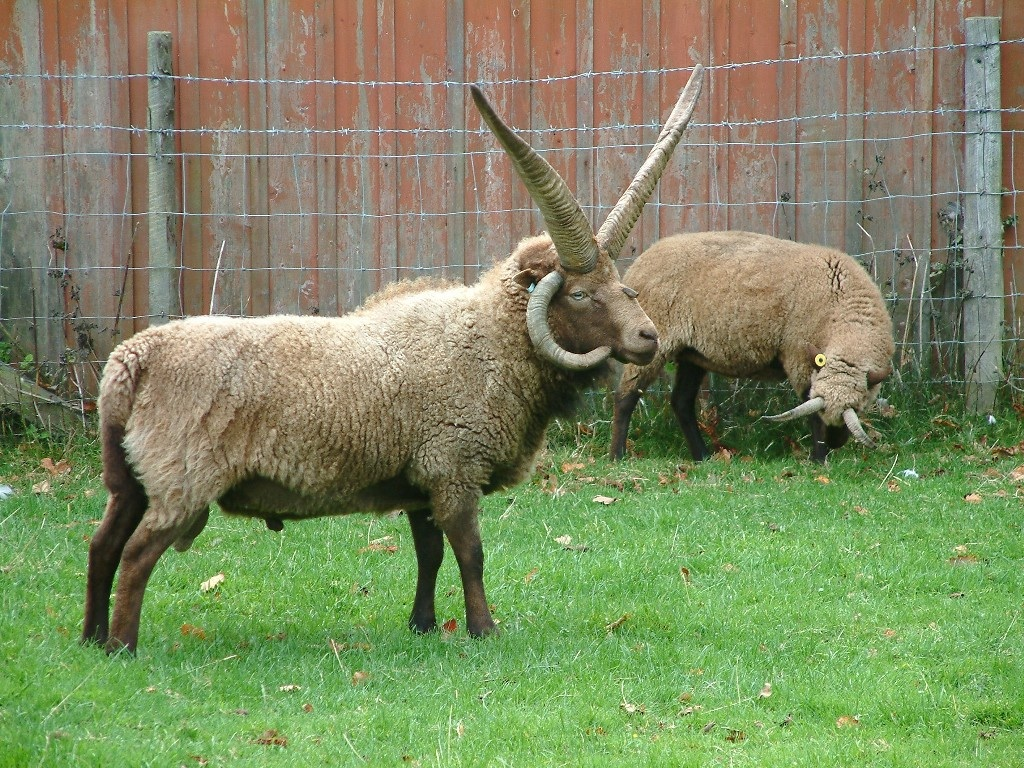
Manx Loaghtan sheep are bred on the island for their meat.

The Manx Loaghtan sheep is a breed native to the island. It has dark brown wool and four, or sometimes six, horns. The meat is considered to be a delicacy. There are several flocks on the island and others have been started in England and Jersey.

A more recent arrival on the island is the red-necked wallaby, which is now established on the island following an escape from the Wildlife Park. The local police report an increasing number of wallaby-related calls.

There are also many feral goats in Garff, a matter which was raised in Tynwald Court in January 2018.

In March 2016, the Isle of Man became the first entire territory to be adopted into UNESCO's Network of Biosphere Reserves.

== Demographics ==
=== Population ===
At the 2021 census, the Isle of Man was home to 84,069 people, of whom 26,677 resided in the island's capital, Douglas. The population increased by 755 people between the 2016 and 2021 censuses.

==== Census ====
The Isle of Man Full Census, last held in 2021, has been a decennial occurrence since 1821, with interim censuses being introduced from 1966. It is separate from, but similar to, the Census in the United Kingdom.

=== Age structure ===
0–14 years: 16.27% (male 7,587, female 6,960)
15–24 years: 11.3% (male 5,354, female 4,750)
25–54 years: 38.48% (male 17,191, female 17,217)
55–64 years: 13.34% (male 6,012, female 5,919)
65 years and over: 20.6% (male 8,661, female 9,756) (2018 est.)

=== Population density ===
131 people/km^{2} (339 people/sq mi) (2005 est.)

=== Sex ratio ===
Sex ratios (males per female)
Age range	Ratio
At birth	1.08
0–14	1.09
15–24	1.13
25–54	1.00
55–64	1.02
65+	0.89
Total population	1 (2020 est.)

=== Infant mortality rate ===
Total: 4 deaths/1,000 live births
Male: 4 deaths/1,000 live births
Female: 4 deaths/1,000 live births (2018 est.)
Country comparison to the world: 191

=== Life expectancy at birth ===
Total population: 81.4 years
Male: 78.1 years
Female: 83.6 years (2021 est.)
Country comparison to the world: 29
Total fertility rate: 1.92 children born/woman (2018 est.)

=== Nationality ===
noun: Manxman (men), Manxwoman (women)
adjective: Manx

=== Ethnicity ===
White: 94.7%
Asian: 3.1%
Black: 0.6%
Other: 0.6%
Mixed: 1.0%

=== Religion ===
Christianity: 54.7%
No religion: 43.8%
Buddhism: 0.5%
Islam: 0.5%
Hinduism: 0.4%
Judaism: 0.2%

=== Country of birth ===
- Isle of Man: 49.6%
- United Kingdom: 43.3%
  - England: 38.2%
  - Scotland : 3.0%
  - Northern Ireland: 2.0%
  - Wales: 1.1%
- Republic of Ireland: 1.8%
  - Europe (total) 93.6%
- Another country: 8.5%:
  - Asia 3.0%
  - Americas 0.8%
  - Africa 2.3%
  - Oceania 0.4%

== See also ==
- History of the Isle of Man
- Outline of the Isle of Man
- List of people from the Isle of Man
- List of places in the Isle of Man
- United Kingdom–Crown Dependencies Customs Union
- Public holidays in the Isle of Man

== Bibliography ==
- Moore, Arthur William (1903). Manx Names (Revised Cheap ed.). London: Elliot Stock. Archived from the original on 6 May 2024 – via Google Books.
- Sacheverell, William (1859). Cumming, Joseph George (ed.). An Account of the Isle of Man. Douglas: The Manx Society. Archived from the original on 6 May 2024 – via Google Books.
- Waldron, George (1726). Harrison, William (ed.). A Description of the Isle of Man. Douglas: The Manx Society. Archived from the original on 6 May 2024 – via Google Books.
- This article incorporates text from a publication now in the public domain: Moore, Arthur William (1911). "Man, Isle of". In Chisholm, Hugh (ed.). Encyclopædia Britannica. Vol. 17 (11th ed.). Cambridge University Press. pp. 534–539.
