= Isle of Man Courier =

- Type: Weekly newspaper
- Owner(s): Isle of Man Newspapers
- Publisher: Tindle

The Isle of Man Courier is a free weekly newspaper on the Isle of Man.

It is owned by Isle of Man Newspapers (now part of Tindle Newspapers) and its sister newspapers are the Isle of Man Examiner and the Manx Independent.

== History ==
The Isle of Man Courier can trace its roots back to the Ramsey Courier, which began in 1884. The paper dropped the "Ramsey" part of its title and moved to Ridgeway Street, Douglas, in the 1970s. Its sister newspaper, Mona's Herald, closed in the same decade. The Isle of Man Courier was taken over by another Courier, the Halifax Courier, and was printed in Yorkshire for some time.

The Isle of Man Courier became a free, delivered newspaper in 1981. The company made the decision after complaining that the Isle of Man Government was starving it of advertising by favouring the Isle of Man Examiner and its sister papers, the Isle of Man Weekly Times and the Manx Star. After a strike killed off the Examiner, Isle of Man Times, Manx Star and Isle of Man Gazette in 1987, the Courier Group bought the titles and the Examiner's premises in Hill Street, Douglas.

This meant the Courier could print on the island again. The Courier Group relaunched the Isle of Man Examiner in competition with the Manx Independent, which was started by journalists who had been sacked during the Examiner group strike.

The Isle of Man Courier Group was renamed Isle of Man Newspapers a few years after it absorbed the Examiner. The Manx Independent folded in 1993 and was bought by Isle of Man Newspapers and relaunched as a weekly newspaper.
