= Hoodening =

Folk custom from Kent, England

Hoodeners in Deal, Kent, in 1909

Hoodening (/ʊd.ɛnɪŋ/), also spelled hodening and oodening, is a folk custom found in Kent, a county in South East England. The tradition entails the use of a wooden hobby horse known as a hooden horse that is mounted on a pole and carried by a person hidden under a sackcloth. Originally, the tradition was restricted to the area of East Kent, although in the twentieth century it spread into neighbouring West Kent. It represents a regional variation of a "hooded animal" tradition that appears in various forms throughout Britain and Ireland.

As recorded from the eighteenth to the early twentieth centuries, hoodening was a tradition performed at Christmas time by groups of farm labourers. They would form into teams to accompany the hooden horse on its travels around the local area, and although the makeup of such groups varied, they typically included someone to carry the horse, a leader, a man in female clothing known as a "Mollie", and several musicians. The team would then carry the hooden horse to local houses and shops, where they would expect payment for their appearance. Although this practice is extinct, in the present the hooden horse is incorporated into various Kentish mummers plays and Morris dances that take place at different times of the year.

The origins of the hoodening tradition, and the original derivation of the term hooden, remain subject to academic debate. An early suggestion was that hooden was related to the Anglo-Saxon pre-Christian god Woden (Odin), and that the tradition therefore originated with pre-Christian religious practices in the early medieval Kingdom of Kent. This idea has not found support from historians or folklorists studying the tradition. A more widely accepted explanation among scholars is that the term hooden relates to hooded, a reference to the sackcloth worn by the person carrying the horse. The absence of late medieval references to such practices and the geographic dispersal of the various British hooded animal traditions—among them the Mari Lwyd of south Wales, the Broad of the Cotswolds, and the Old Ball, Old Tup, and Old Horse of northern England—have led to suggestions that they derive from the regionalised popularisation of the sixteenth- and seventeenth-century fashion for hobby horses among the social elite.

The earliest textual reference to the hoodening tradition comes from the first half of the eighteenth century. Scattered references to it appeared over the next century and a half, many of which considered it to be a declining tradition that had died out in many parts of Kent. Aware of this decline, in the early twentieth century the folklorist and historian Percy Maylam documented what survived of the tradition and traced its appearances in historical documents, publishing his findings as The Hooden Horse in 1909. Although deemed extinct at the time of the First World War, the custom was revived in an altered form during the mid-twentieth century, when the use of the hooden horse was incorporated into some modern Kentish folk traditions.

== Description ==
"I remember as a child being taken out on Christmas Eve to the High Street in Deal where the shops would be open very late, and it was the only time Deal children were allowed out in the evening, parents were very strict. As we would be looking at the lighted shops, and listening to the people selling their wares, a horrible growl, and a long horse's face would appear, resting on our shoulder and when one looked round, there would be a long row of teeth snapping at us with its wooden jaws. It was frightening for a child. Usually, there would be a man leading the horse, with a rope, and another covered over with sacks or blankets as the horse."

— Naomi Wiffen of Edenbridge, interviewed in the early 1980s.

Surviving sources testify to the fact that while there was some variation in the hoodening tradition as it was practised by various people in different parts of East Kent, it was nevertheless "on the whole remarkably uniform". The hooden horse, which was at the centre of the tradition, was usually made out of a wooden horse's head affixed to a pole about four feet long, with a hinged jaw that was moved by a string. This horse was then carried aloft by a person concealed beneath a dark cloth.

As part of the hoodening custom, a team of "hoodeners", consisting of between four and eight men, would carry the horse through the streets. This team included the horse operator, a "Groom", "Driver", or "Waggoner" who carried a whip and led the horse by a bridle, a "Jockey" who would attempt to mount the horse, a "Mollie" who was a man dressed as a woman, and one or two musicians. All of the men were farm labourers, usually being those who worked with horses.

The team performed the custom at Christmas time, and usually on Christmas Eve. The team would arrive at people's houses where they would sing a song before being admitted entry. Once inside, the horse pranced and gnashed its jaw, while the Jockey attempted to mount it, and the Mollie swept the floor with a broom while chasing any girls present. Sometimes they would sing further songs and carols. Upon being presented with payment, the team would leave to repeat the process at another house.

== Regional distribution ==
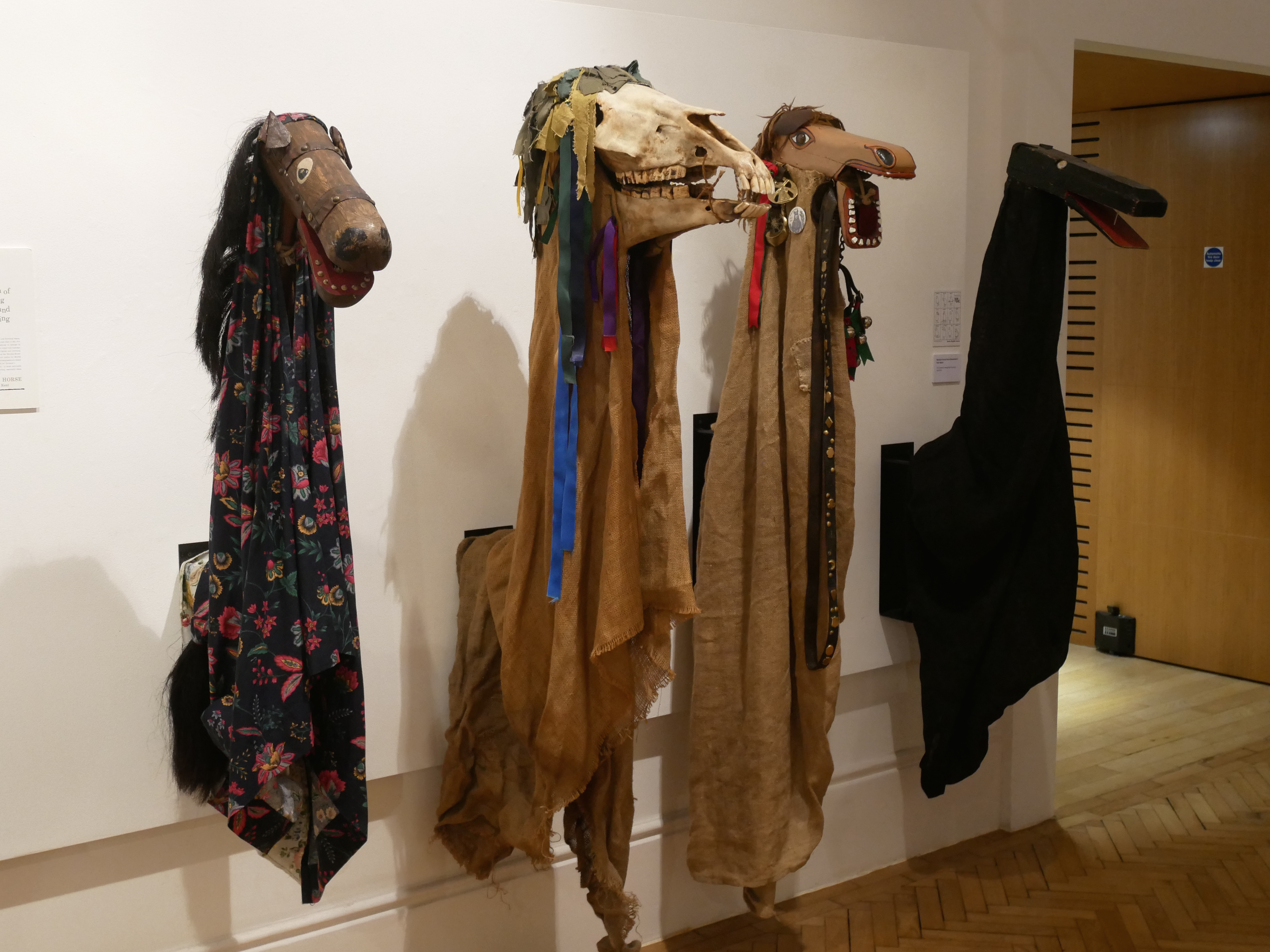
Four Kentish hooden horses of 20th and 21st-century date, on temporary display at Maidstone Museum

Historians have catalogued 33 recorded instances of the hoodening tradition extant in Kent prior to the twentieth-century revival. These are clustered in a crescent shape along the eastern and northern coasts of the county, and all were found within the area historically defined as East Kent, the tradition being unknown in neighbouring West Kent. More specifically, the folklorist Percy Maylam noted that there were no records of the tradition having been found west of Godmersham.

This region was "a well populated area" during the period in which the hoodeners were active, and Maylam noted that all of the areas in which the tradition was found contained the East Kentish dialect. The folklorist E. C. Cawte analysed the historical distribution of the hoodeners and found that it did not correspond with the areas of early Anglo-Saxon settlement in Kent, nor did it accord with the county's coal mining areas. He concluded that "there is no apparent reason why the custom did not spread further afield".

Hoodening was part of a wider "hooded animal" tradition that Cawte identified in various forms across Britain. Features common to these customs were the use of a hobby horse, the performance at Christmas time, a song or spoken statement requesting payment, and the use of a team who included a man dressed in women's clothing. In South Wales, the Mari Lwyd tradition featured troupes of men with a hobby horse knocking at doors over the Christmas period. In an area along the border between Derbyshire and Yorkshire, the Old Tup tradition featured groups knocking on doors around Christmas carrying a hobby horse that had a goat's head. The folklorist Christina Hole drew parallels between hoodening and the Christmas Bull tradition recorded in Dorset and Gloucestershire. In south-west England, there are two extant hobby horse traditions—the Padstow 'Obby 'Oss festival and Minehead Hobby Horse—which take place not at Christmas time but on May Day.

Although the origins of these "hooded animal" traditions are not known with any certainty, the lack of any late medieval references to such practices may suggest that they emerged from the documented elite fashion for hobby horses in the sixteenth and seventeenth centuries. In this, the hooded animal traditions may be comparable to England's Morris dance tradition, which became a "nation-wide craze" in the sixteenth and seventeenth centuries before evolving into "a set of sharply delineated regional traditions".

== Etymology and origins ==
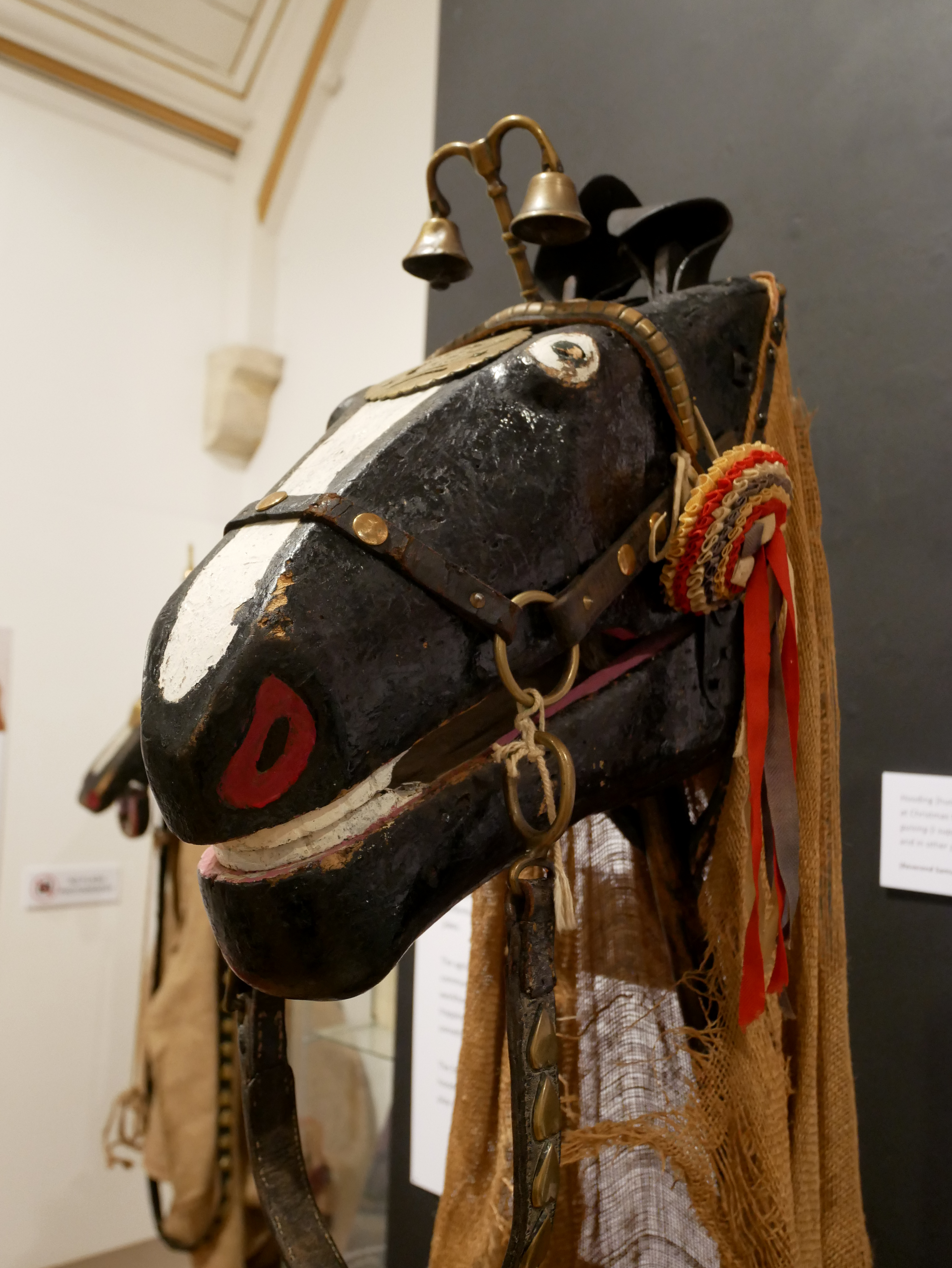
"Satan," a hooden horse used by the St Nicholas at Wade with Sarre hoodeners; on display at the Maidstone Museum

Maylam noted that most nineteenth-century sources describing the tradition had spelled the word as hoden, but that he favoured hooden because it better reflected the pronunciation of the word with its long vowel. He added that "the word 'hooden' rhymes with 'wooden' and not with 'sodden' as some writers appear to think". Given this pronunciation, Cawte suggested that oodening was a better spelling for the tradition's name. Maylam also noted that none of the hoodeners with whom he communicated were aware of the etymology of the term, and that similarly they were unaware of the tradition's historical origins.

The term hoodening is thus of unknown derivation. One possible explanation for the origin of hooden was that it had emerged as a mispronunciation of wooden, referring to the use of the wooden horse. Maylam was critical of this idea, expressing the view that such a mispronunciation was unlikely to emerge from the Kentish dialect. A second possibility is that the name hooden was a reference to the hooded nature of the horse's bearer. The historian Ronald Hutton deemed this to be the "simplest" derivation, while folklorists Cawte and Charlotte Sophia Burne also considered it the most likely explanation. Maylam was also critical of this, suggesting that the cloth under which the carrier was concealed was too large to be considered a hood. In his History of Kent the antiquarian Alfred John Dunkin suggested that Hodening was a corruption of Hobening, and that it was ultimately derived from the Gothic hopp, meaning horse. Maylam opined that Dunkin's argument could be "ignored", stating that it rested on the erroneous assumption that Hodening began with a short vowel.

Maylam concluded that the hoodening tradition was "a mutilated survival" of a form of Morris dance. Noting that some medieval Morris dancers had incorporated games devoted to the English folk hero Robin Hood into their custom, he suggested that hoodening might have originally been a reference to Robin Hood. This idea was challenged by Burne, who noted that in his legends, Robin Hood was always depicted as an archer rather than a horse-rider, thus questioning how he had come to be associated with the hooden horse. She further noted that the medieval games devoted to Robin Hood all took place in May rather than at Christmas, as hoodening did. Cawte also criticised Maylam's argument, noting that there was no evidence of Morris dancing in Kent prior to the twentieth century, and that neither hoodening nor Robin Hood had a particularly close association with the Morris dance to start with.

=== Possible Early Medieval origins ===
The folklorist Geoff Doel suggested a possible connection between the hooden horse and the white horse that appears as on the flag of Kent

In 1807 an anonymous observer suggested that the term hoden was linked to the Anglo-Saxon god Woden, and that the tradition might be "a relic of a festival to commemorate our Saxon ancestors landing in Thanet". In 1891 it was suggested that the custom had once been known as "Odining", a reference to the early medieval Scandinavian god Odin. The author of this idea further suggested that the custom had begun either with the ritual wearing of the skins of horses sacrificed to Odin, or as an early Christian mockery of such Odinic practices.

Maylam noted that he was initially attracted to the idea that the term hodening had derived from Woden—an Old English name that he thought a more likely origin than the Old Norse Odin—but that upon investigating this possibility found "no sufficient evidence" for it. He added that it would seem unlikely that the W would be lost from Woden in the Kentish dialect, citing the example of Woodnesborough, a Kentish village whose name is often interpreted as having derived from Woden and which clearly retains its use of W. He concluded that "one feels that the theory is based on inferences and analogies not strong enough for a foundation to carry the building erected on them". The idea of linking the tradition to Woden was also dismissed as unlikely by both Burne and Cawte.

Believing it likely that the hoodening tradition "substantially pre-dates" its earliest textual appearances, the folklorist Geoff Doel suggested the possibility that it had originated as a Midwinter rite to re-energise the vegetation. As evidence for this claim, Doel noted that other English winter folk customs, such as the Apple Wassail, have also been interpreted in this manner. He also suggested that the use of the horse in the tradition may have some connections to either the use of the white horse as the symbol of Kent, and the use of Hengist and Horsa (literally "stallion" and "horse" in Old English) as prominent characters in the origin myths of the early medieval Kingdom of Kent. However, the white horse did not become commonly associated with Kent until the beginning of the eighteenth century, and James Lloyd regards any suggestion of an ancient connection with hoodening as "wishful thinking and in defiance of all historical evidence".

== Recorded appearances ==
=== Early textual references ===
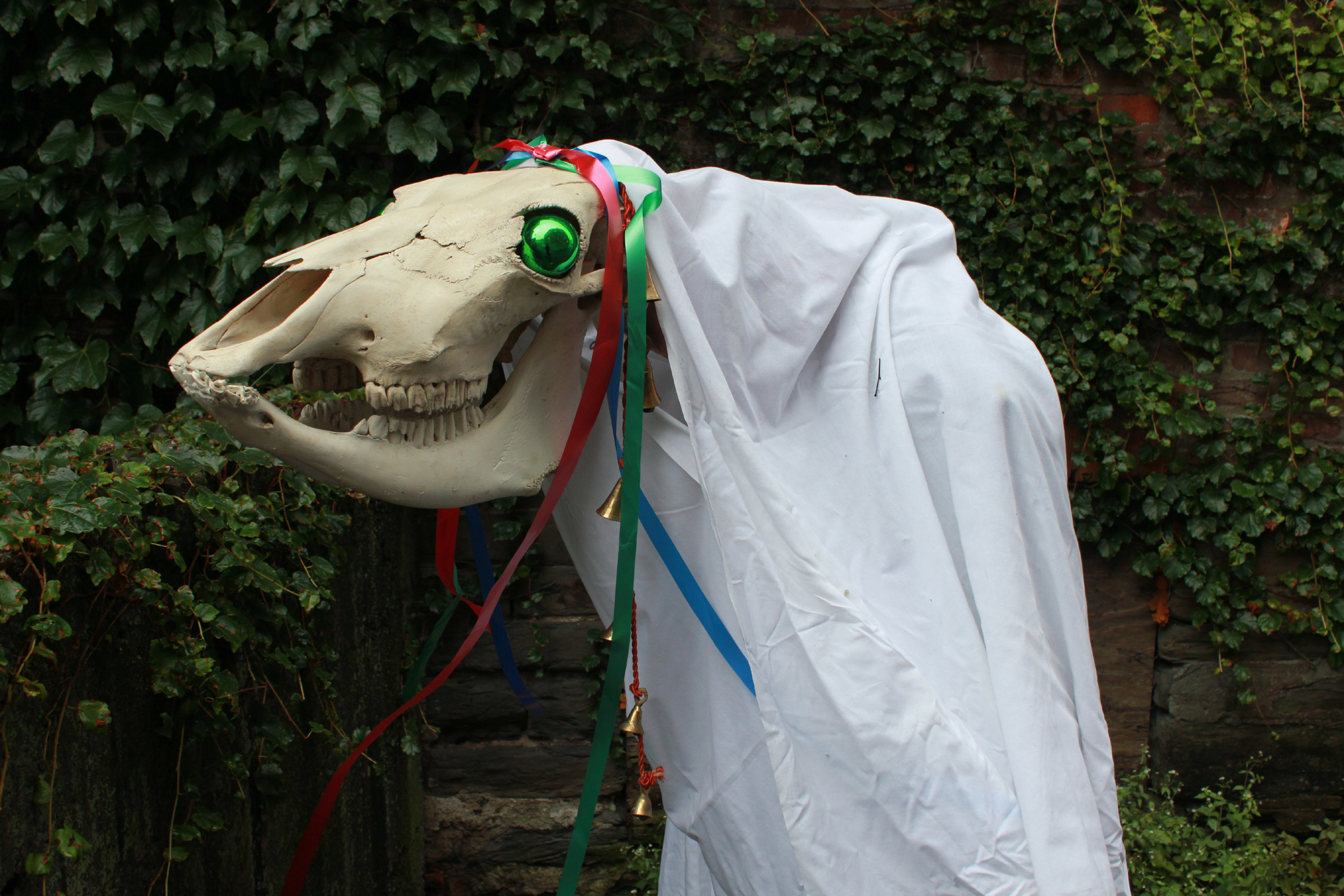
The earliest surviving descriptions of hoodening claim that the hooden horse contained a horse's skull, akin to this modern example of the Mari Lwyd, a Welsh hobby horse.

The oldest known textual reference to hoodening comes from the Alphabet of Kenticisms, a manuscript authored by Samuel Pegge, an antiquary who served as the vicar of Godmersham in Kent from 1731 to 1751. After Pegge died, the manuscript was obtained by the palaeographer Sir Frederic Madden, and after his death it was purchased by the English Dialect Society, who published it in 1876. In this manuscript Pegge noted simply that "Hoodening (huod.ing) is a country masquerade at Christmas times", comparing it to mumming and the Winster Guisers of Derbyshire.

The earliest known textual description of the tradition is provided by a letter that was published in a May 1807 edition of European Magazine. The letter, written anonymously, described an encounter with the hoodeners on a visit to the Kentish coastal town of Ramsgate in Thanet:

I found they begin the festivities of Christmas by a curious procession: a party of young people procure the head of a dead horse, which is affixed to a pole about four feet in length; a string is affixed to the lower jaw; a horse-cloth is also attached to the whole, under which one of the parts gets, and by frequently pulling the string, keeps up a loud snapping noise, and is accompanied by the rest of the party, grotesquely habited, with hand-bells; they thus proceed from house to house, ringing their bells, and singing carols and songs; they are commonly gratified with beer and cake, or perhaps with money. This is called, provincially, a Hodening.

Later commenting on this source, Maylam highlighted that its author did not appear to be from Kent and that, from their use of wording, it appeared that they had been told about the tradition by locals but had not actually witnessed it first hand. As such, Maylam suggested that the author may have been wrong in describing the use of a horse's skull in the Ramsgate tradition, given that both later sources and the hoodeners of his own time all used a wooden model of a horse's head. At the same time, Maylam noted that the use of a horse's skull was not impossible, for such skulls had also been used in the hobby horse traditions of other parts of Britain.

The anonymously authored account was repeated almost verbatim in a range of other publications in the coming decades, giving its description far wider exposure. The first printed reference to the hooden horse having a wooden head appeared in Mackenzie E. C. Walcott's Guide to the Coast of Kent, published in 1859, where he referred to a "curious custom [which] used to prevail" in Ramsgate. Maylam later suggested that the Ramsgate hooden horse tradition died out between 1807 and 1838, for he had interviewed elderly town residents in the early twentieth century and while several were aware that it had once taken place in the town, none could recall it happening in their own lifetime.

=== Later nineteenth century ===
Hoodeners from Hale Farm in St. Nicholas-at-Wade, Kent, photographed in June 1905

Many years after the event, the Kentish antiquarian J. Meadows Cooper related that while sitting in a pub on the outskirts of Margate on Boxing Day 1855 he had encountered a party carrying a hooden horse that entered the building. Another local resident, Mrs. Edward Tomlin, later related that as a child she had lived at a house named Updown, near Margate, and that she remembered the hooden horse visiting them at Christmas time during the 1850s and up until 1865.

Maylam's researches also found recollections of a hooden horse that had appeared in Herne and Swalecliffe but which had been discontinued in the 1860s, another that was active from Wingate Farm House in Harbledown during the 1850s, and one that had been active at Evington but which had ceased by the 1860s. He found another based at Lower Hardres that had been active from at least the 1850s under the leadership of Henry Brazier; it was subsequently taken over by his son John, until the tradition ended locally in 1892. In a January 1868 edition of the Kentish Gazette, an anonymous author mentioned that hoodening had taken place in Minster, Swale, on the Christmas Eve of 1867. The author noted that the tradition featured carol singing and the ringing of handbells, which were accompanied by the appearance of a hooden horse; they expressed surprise at this latter event because they had thought that the horse was "as extinct as the megatherium".

In their 1888 Dictionary of the Kentish Dialect, W. D. Parish and W. F. Shaw claimed that Hodening was a term used in Kent to refer to a custom involving the singing of carols, but that in the past Hoodening had been applied to "a mumming or masquerade" involving the hooden horse. They added that they had gained information on this older custom in 1876 from the Reverend H. Bennett Smith of St Nicholas-at-Wade, who had in turn learned from a retired farmer in his parish that "the farmer used to send annually round the neighbourhood the best horse under the charge of the wagoner, and that afterwards instead, a man used to represent the horse, being supplied with a tail, and with a wooden figure of a horse's head, and plenty of horse hair for a mane ... The custom has long since ceased."

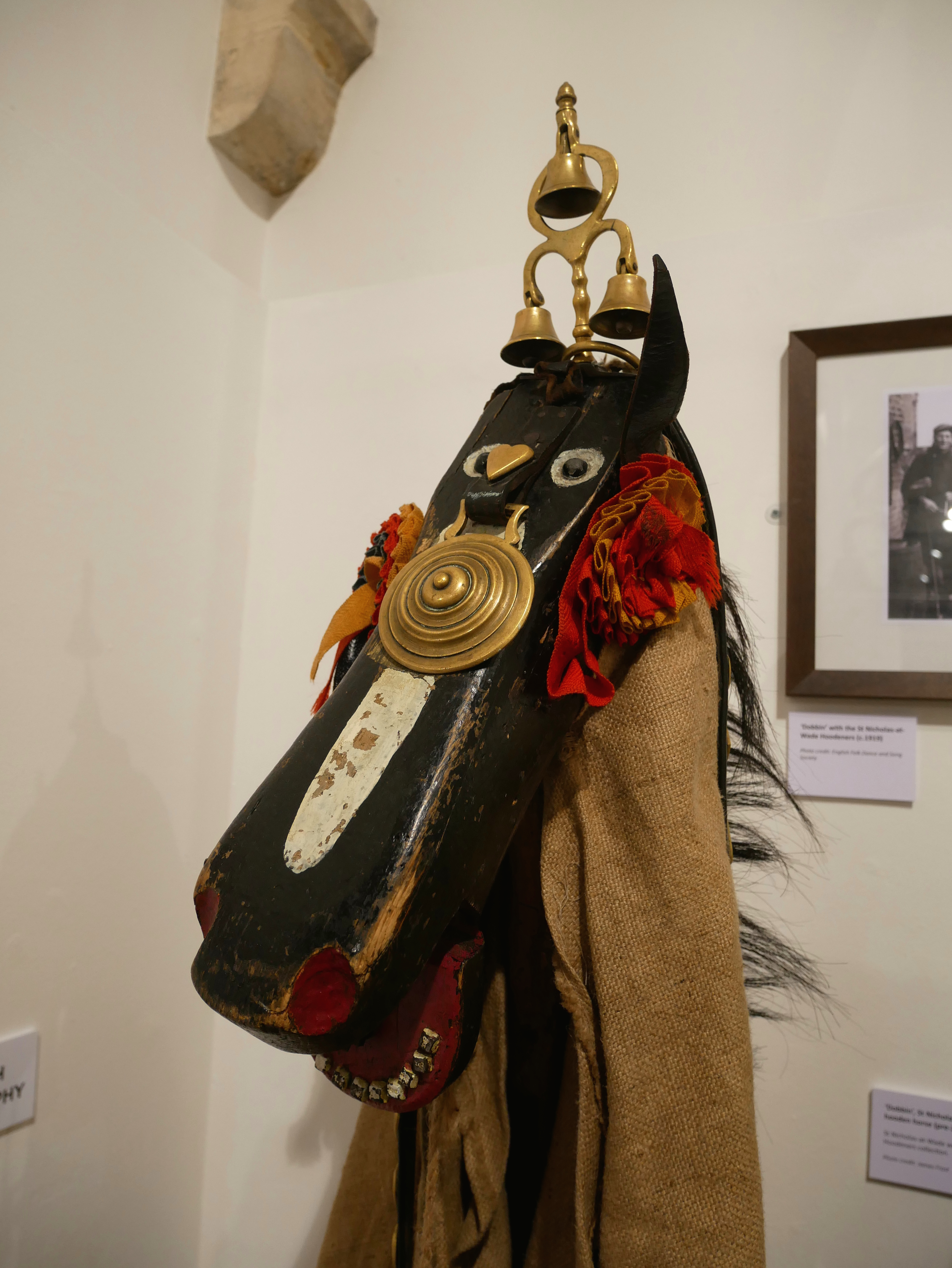
"Dobbin," a 19th-century hooden horse from St Nicholas-at-Wade

Parish and Shaw did not mention what time of year the tradition took place or its geographical location. They also made no reference to a sack concealing the person carrying the horse. Doel thought it likely that neither Parish or Shaw had ever seen a hooden horse, and that instead their information was based on older written sources. He also thought it noteworthy that they described the tradition using the past tense, indicating that they considered it to be either dead or dying at the time of writing. Maylam believed that the information regarding the decline of the tradition was erroneous, because hoodeners were still active in St. Nicholas-at-Wade during the early twentieth century and various locals living in the area at the time could recall it taking place in the area back to the 1840s.

In December 1889 a letter written by a resident of St. Lawrence named Charles J. H. Saunders appeared in the Bromley Record. Saunders said he had conversed with many elderly residents of Thanet on the subject of hoodening, and that they informed him that the custom had been discontinued around fifty years previously, after a woman in Broadstairs was so scared by the hooden horse that she died. He added that a horse's skull was rarely used, "owing to the difficulty procuring one", and that the wooden head was thus typically used as a replacement. He said the hoodening company typically consisted of a "Jockey" who placed himself on the back of the person carrying the horse, and that it was the "sport" that bystanders attempted to throw him off, resulting in violence. The horse and jockey were also accompanied by two singers, two attendants, and someone dressed as an "old woman" carrying a broom; when the company knocked on people's doors, it was the old woman's job to sweep the inhabitants feet away with her broom and to chase any girls until being paid off with money or refreshments. He was of the opinion that the custom had been restricted to the Isle of Thanet, noting that locals informed him that it had been carried out in Ramsgate, St. Lawrence, Minster, St. Nicholas, Acol, Monkton, and Birchington. Contradicting this were several letters published in the Church Times in January 1891 which attested to the continuing practice of the hooden horse tradition at both Deal and Walmer.

=== Percy Maylam's investigations ===
Percy Maylam was born into a farming family in 1865 at Pivington Farm in Pluckley and, in 1890, became a solicitor of the Supreme Court before working as a solicitor at Canterbury. As well as being a keen cricketer and coin collector, Maylam was an amateur historian and in 1892 joined the Kent Archaeological Society. During the 1880s, Maylam came upon the hoodening tradition and began undertaking research into it, searching for textual references to the tradition in books, periodicals, and newspapers, and interviewing those involved in three extant traditions, at St Nicholas-at-Wade, Walmer, and Deal. He expressed the opinion that "in these days Kent possesses so few genuine popular customs of this kind that we cannot afford to be indifferent to those still in existence. This is my excuse for my attempt to record the custom as now existing before it is utterly lost to us."

Hoodeners from Walmer Court Farm, Walmer, in March 1907

The period in which Maylam conducted his research was one that was witnessing increased interest in the recording of Britain's rural folk culture, in particular by members of the professional classes—of which Maylam was a member—in part due to the fear that such traditions were rapidly dying out. Such folklore collecting was encouraged by The Folklore Society, with whom Maylam was associated, and also by the widely read book The Golden Bough, a work of comparative folkloristics authored by the anthropologist James Frazer. Maylam published his research in 1909 as The Hooden Horse, in an edition limited to 303 copies. The book was reviewed in the journal Folklore by Burne, who described it as "an admirable piece of work, careful, thorough, unambitious, and complete in itself". Cawte later described it as "unusually good", while Fran and Geoff Doel regarded it as "a very enlightened piece of Edwardian folk research".

Maylam concluded that at the time, there was only one hooden horse still in active use in Thanet, that stored at Hale Farm in St. Nicholas-at-Wade, which he noted was brought out each Christmas to visit Sarre, Birchington, and St. Nicholas-at-Wade itself. The members included a man in female garb, known as the Mollie, in their procession, but added that this had not been done for some time and was thus reintroduced for Maylam's benefit. In his book, Maylam included a photograph of the horse taken at Sarre in 1905. On Christmas Eve 1906, Maylam encountered a second hooden horse, this time at Walmer. This horse came into the local hotel tearoom at about 6.30 pm, accompanied by two musicians—one playing the tambourine and the other the concertina—and a man named Robert Laming who led the horse itself. They were wearing ordinary clothes, but informed Maylam that they had once worn smock frocks as part of the tradition. They had no Mollie, and the members could not recall a Mollie ever having been part of their custom. The hotel owner's daughter placed a gratuity in the horse's mouth, before the troupe moved on to the local shops, where they were also given gratuities in a similar manner. Maylam talked to the troupe about the tradition, and eventually organised the photographing of the Walmer horse and those who accompanied it in March 1907.

"This is an admirable piece of work, careful, thorough, unambitious, and complete in itself. Mr. Maylam has all the humour and sympathy and unfeigned enjoyment of his informants' society and doings that go to the making of a genuine [folklore] collector, and adds to them the skill in weighing and marshalling evidence that belongs to his legal training; and he has left no point untouched that could serve to throw light on his subject."

— Charlotte Sophia Burne, 1910.

Maylam also interviewed those involved in the hoodening tradition at Deal, whom he encountered in the summer of 1909. One elderly gentleman, Robert Skardon, related that his father had once led the town's hoodening troupe, in which he personally carried the head, his father the drum, his "Uncle John Beaney" the fiddle, and "old Harry Chorner" the piccolo. For many years they had included a man dressed in woman's clothing, who was known as a "Daisy" rather than a "Mollie", but that this had been discontinued. Skardon had given up the tradition many years previously, and the hooden horse itself had come into the possession of Elbridge Bowles of Great Mongeham, who continued to lead a hoodening troupe after Christmas each year, visiting Deal as well as the neighbouring villages of Finglesham, Ripple, Tilmanstone, Eastry, and Betteshanger. Maylam was also informed that at the time of Britain's involvement in the Second Boer War, the horse had been decorated with military equipment. The fourth hooden horse that Maylam encountered was owned by the men who worked at George Goodson's farm in Fenland, Word, near Sandwich. They informed him that it had been made by a farm hand in Cleve, Monkton, before being brought to Word when one of the Cleve farm workers relocated there.

Maylam believed that the custom—as a "natural and spontaneous observance" among the people—was clearly going to die out, expressing his hope that the hooden horses could be preserved in Kentish museums and brought out for specially arranged public processions so as to maintain their place in Kentish culture. In later life, Maylam focused his attentions on exploring his family history, privately publishing Maylam Family Records in 1932, before dying in 1939. In the century following his death Maylam's book on hoodening became difficult to obtain and expensive to purchase, and so to mark the centenary of its first publication, it was republished in 2009 by The History Press, under the altered title of The Kent Hooden Horse. Writing an introductory article for the second publication, Doel, a specialist in Kentish folklore, praised Maylam's book as a "classic study" which was "impressive for its separation of fact from speculation as to the origins and significance of the custom."

=== Twentieth-century revival ===
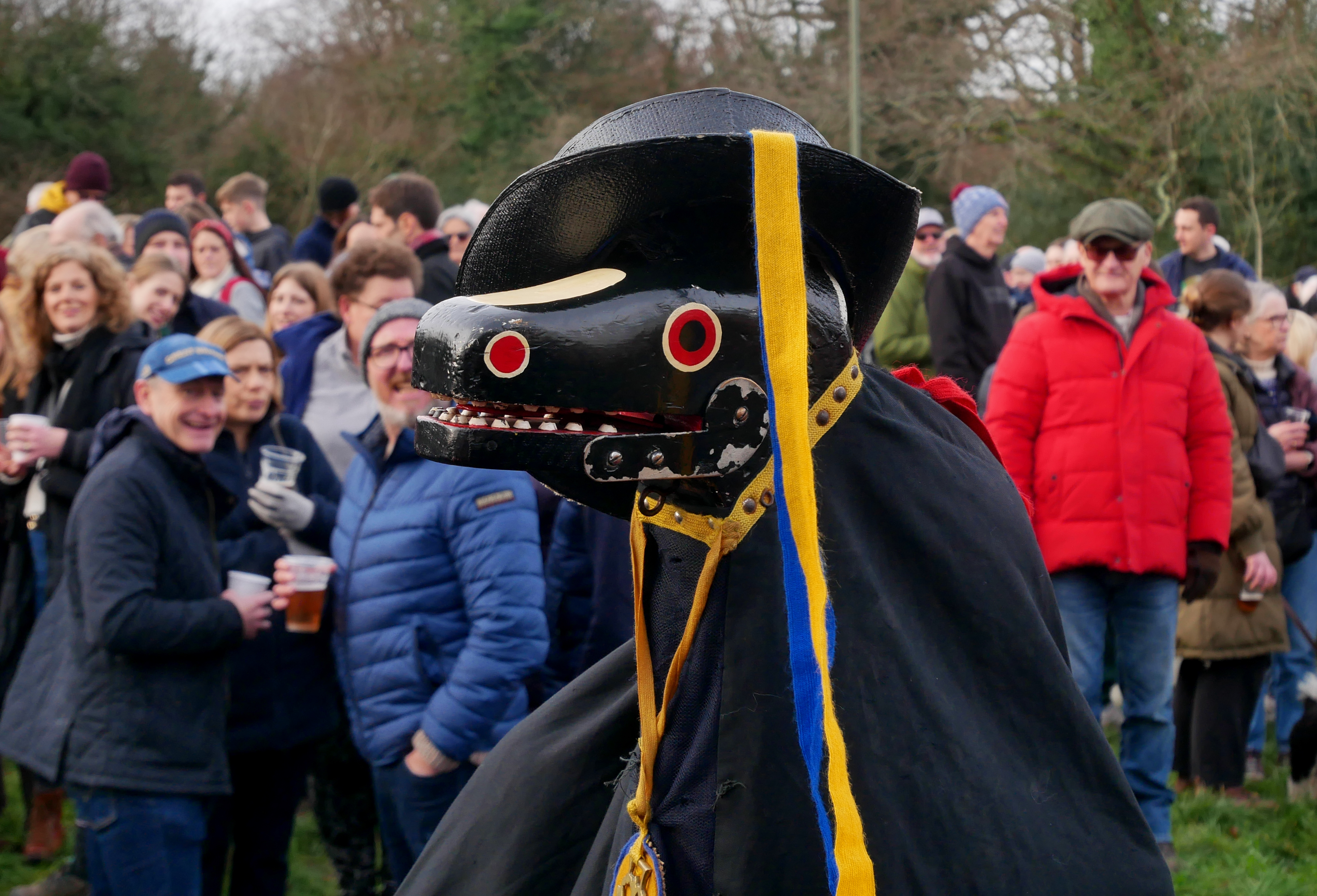
A hooden horse accompanying the Ravensbourne Morris Men at their annual Boxing Day dance in Keston in 2023

Writing in 1967, the folklorist Barnett Field claimed that at some point after Maylam's book was published, hoodening had "died out. The Horses were hung up in the stables, and when the tractors came, were taken out and burnt on the bonfire." Doel and Doel later suggested that it was the impact of the First World War which effectively ended the tradition. Field noted that the first revival of the custom after the war took place at the 1936 Kent District Folk-Dance Festival at Aylesford. A new horse was specially created for this festival, and was modelled on an older example that had been used at Sarre. The hobby horse had not previously had any connection with Morris dancing, although was adopted as a totem animal for several Morris sides after the Second World War. This revival in the usage of the horse was heavily influenced by Maylam's book.

The Aylesford horse was adopted by the Ravensbourne Morris Men, a Morris troupe based in the West Kentish village of Keston, in 1947. The Ravensbourne Morris's hoodening tradition is the earliest known variant of the custom to exist in West Kent, although there are accounts of a hooden horse being located at Balgowan School in the West Kentish town of Beckenham during the 1930s. At the 1945 celebration marking British victory in the Second World War, a horse was brought out in Acol; this instance has been described as "a kind of missing link between tradition and revival" because the horse had been used as part of the historical hoodening tradition up until the mid-1920s.

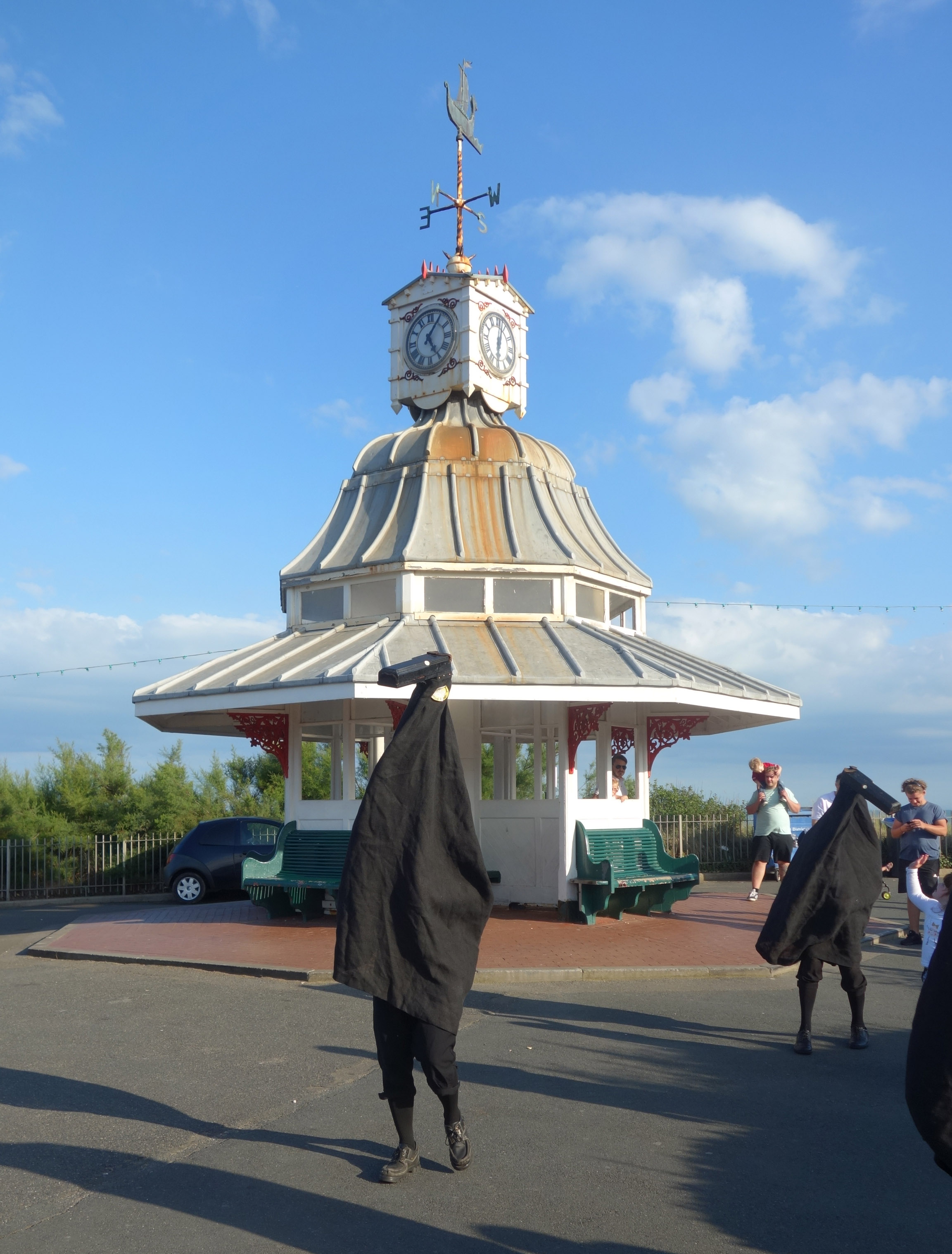
Hooden horses at the Clock Tower in Broadstairs as part of Broadstairs Folk Week 2017

Barnett Field (1912–2000) was born at Wych Cross in the Ashdown Forest and subsequently educated at Tunbridge Wells. He trained as a banker before working as manager of the Hythe and Folkestone branches of the Westminster Bank until his retirement in 1979. Field and his wife, Olive Ridley, had a keen interest in folk dances; she established the Folkestone National Folk Dance Group in 1950, and he founded the East Kent Morris Men in 1953. Field constructed a hooden horse for the group to use, based in large part on the Deal horse photographed for Maylam's book, and unveiled it at the Folkestone celebrations for the coronation of Elizabeth II in June 1953. After this, it came to be used by both the East Kent Morris Men and the Folkestone District National Dance Group's Handbell Ringers, who took it with them for performances in various parts of continental Europe, including Austria, the Netherlands, Yugoslavia, Sweden, and Czechoslovakia, developing what came to be known as "handbell hoodening". The Handbell Ringers also brought out the horse to accompany them as they went around in public collecting money for charity at Christmas time.

From 1954, the horse was also brought out for a Whitsun celebration in which it was paraded from Charing to the village green at Wye. A special service was held in the Charing Church, in which the Morris Men danced in the chancel and through the aisle, while the vicar put a bridle on the horse itself. The horse was also brought out for a July 1956 ceremony in which The Swan Inn, a pub at Wickhambreaux, was officially renamed as The Hooden Horse; present were the East Kent Morris Men, the Handbell Ringers, and the Ravensbourne Morris Men. This venture led to the groups establishing a new folk custom, "hop hoodening", which was derived in part from an older hop-picking ceremony found in the Weald area. Their new custom involved the different groups joining on a tour around the villages of East Kent, beginning at Canterbury Cathedral and going through Ramsgate, Cliftonville, and Herne Bay before ending in a barn dance at Wickhambreaux.

In October 1957 Field was introduced to Jack Laming of Walmer, who as a boy had performed in a hoodening troupe earlier in the century. Laming taught Field more about the historical hoodening tradition, and together they unearthed an old hooden horse that was stored at Walmer's Coldblow Farm; this artefact was later placed on display at Deal Maritime and Local History Museum. In June 1961 Field and his wife established the first Folkestone International Folklore Festival as a biannual celebration of folk customs; it continued for 28 years.

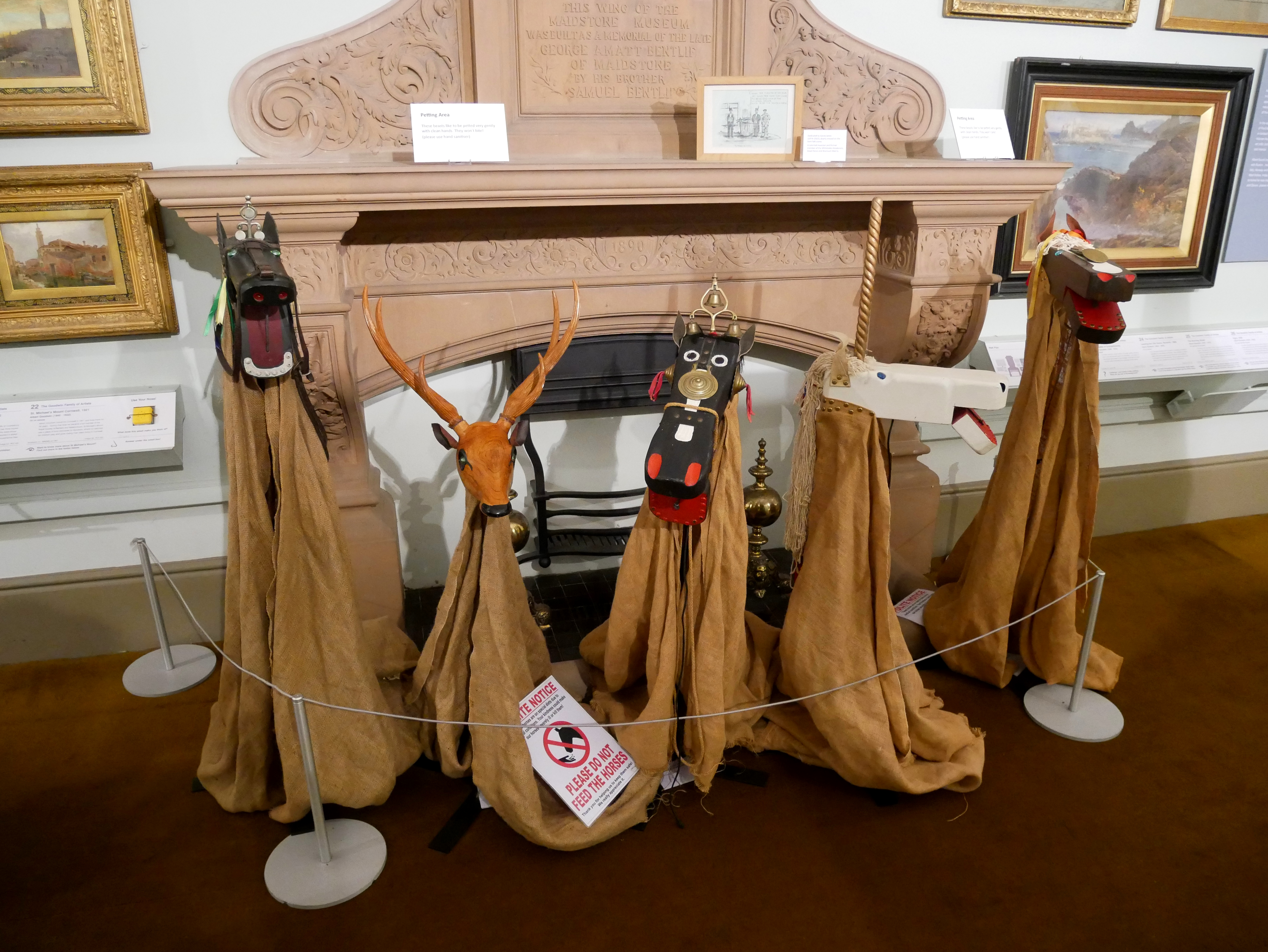
21st-century hooden horses displayed at a Maidstone Museum exhibit in 2023

Since the end of the Second World War, the hooden horse's use has been revived in Whitstable, where it is often brought out for the Jack in the Green festival each May, and is owned by a group called the Ancient Order of Hoodeners. Since 1981, the Tonbridge Mummers and Hoodeners have made use of a horse, incorporating it into a play specially written for the purpose by Doel and Nick Miller. An annual conference of hoodeners was also established; initially meeting at the Marsh Gate Inn near Herne Bay, it subsequently moved to Simple Simon's in Canterbury. A member of the St. Nicholas-at-Wade hoodeners, Ben Jones, established a website devoted to the tradition. At the prompting of local residents, in December 2014 a new Hungry Horse location on the corner of Haine Road and Nash Road in Broadstairs was named the Hooden Horse after the folk custom. Commenting on the Kentish revival of hoodening, Hutton suggested that its success was due largely to the desire of many Kentish folk to culturally distinguish themselves from neighbouring London.
