= Wooing Play =

Form of performance in folk culture of England

The Wooing Play was a form of performance found in the folk culture of parts of east-central England.

The wooing play was performed in a large area of the East Midlands, mostly in Lincolnshire and Nottinghamshire but with some recorded presence in Leicestershire and Rutland.

Many accounts of the wooing play describe its performers as being farm labourers. Ethel H. Rudkin however stated that they were exclusively horsemen, something that the folklorist E. C. Cawte believed was also true of Leicestershire and the adjacent parts of Lincolnshire, an area further south than where Rudkin had conducted her research.

== Hobby horse ==
The use of a hobby horse as part of the wooing play performance was found in a geographically restricted area around the mouth of the River Trent. The use of the hobby horse in the play is not known in Nottinghamshire, although the area in which the wooing play was performed bordered the region in which two Christmas hobby horse traditions, those of Old Tup and Old Horse, were performed.

When used in the wooing play, the hobby horse was always recorded as being called a "hobby horse", rather than by other names as elsewhere in British Isles. Descriptions indicate that it consisted of a large farm sieve which was hung from a man's shoulders, with a wooden horse's head fastened at the front and a tail at the back. A cloth over the man's shoulders was then used to cover the sieve. The tail was sometimes a real horse's tail and was often barbed with hooks or tin-tacks to dissuade people from pulling on it; E. H. Rudkin observed girls who tried to pull a hair from the tail to gain luck and getting scratched as a result. The folklorist E. C. Cawte compared its design to the tourney horse used in the Abbots Bromley Horn Dance, but noted that here there was "even less attempt to produce the illusion of a horse and rider."

At East Butterwick, the rider is recorded as being decorated with horses' brasses. When the hobby horse appeared in the play, it did not take a central role in the action, but entered to recite a few lines, having no evident connection with any of the other characters.

Little is known about the history of the wooing play hobby horse. The oldest possible account came from East Butterwick, where a man recalled it being one of the characters as having been part of the performance circa 1830. The earliest direct observation comes from 1880, produced by Anderson. The hobby horse from Barrow upon Humber was revived for the 1951 Festival of Britain. Cawte noted that this particular performance may have been elaborated for the occasion.
