= Mari Lwyd =

South Wales Christmas folk custom

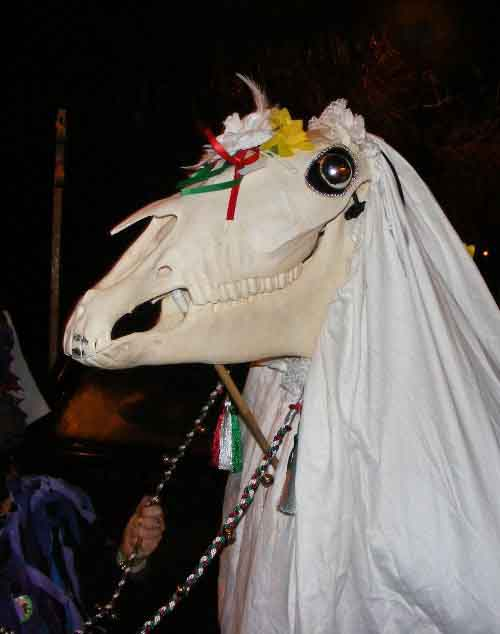
The Mari Lwyd

The Mari Lwyd (/meri lʊid/; Welsh: Y Fari Lwyd, [ə ˈvaːri ˈlʊi̯d]) is a wassailing folk custom in South Wales. The tradition entails the use of an eponymous hobby horse which is made from a horse's skull mounted on a pole and carried by an individual hidden under a sheet.

The custom was first recorded in 1800, with subsequent accounts of it being produced into the early twentieth century. According to these, the Mari Lwyd was a tradition performed at Christmas time by groups of men who would accompany the horse on its travels around the local area, and although the makeup of such groups varied, they typically included an individual to carry the horse, a leader, and individuals dressed as stock characters such as Punch and Judy. The men would carry the Mari Lwyd to local houses, where they would request entry through song. The householders would be expected to deny them entry, again through song, and the two sides would continue their responses to one another in this manner. If the householders eventually relented, the team would be permitted entry and given food and drink.

Although the custom was given various names, it was best known as the Mari Lwyd; the etymology of this term remains the subject of academic debate. The folklorist Iorwerth Peate believed that the term meant "Holy Mary" and thus was a reference to Mary, mother of Jesus, while the folklorist E. C. Cawte thought it more likely that the term had originally meant "Grey Mare", referring to the heads' equine appearance. Several earlier folklorists to examine the topic, such as Peate and Ellen Ettlinger, believed that the tradition had once been a pre-Christian religious rite, although scholarly support for this interpretation has declined amid a lack of supporting evidence. The absence of late medieval references to such practices and the geographic dispersal of the various British hooded animal traditions—among them the Hoodening of Kent, the Broad of the Cotswolds, and the Old Ball, Old Tup, and Old Horse of northern England—have led to suggestions that they derive from the regionalised popularisation of the sixteenth and seventeenth-century fashion for hobby horses among the social elite.

Although the tradition declined in the early to mid-twentieth century, partly due to opposition from some local Christian clergy and changing social conditions, it was revived in new forms in the mid-to-latter part of the century. The tradition has also inspired various artistic depictions, appearing, for instance, in the work of the painter Clive Hicks-Jenkins and the poet Vernon Watkins.

== Description ==
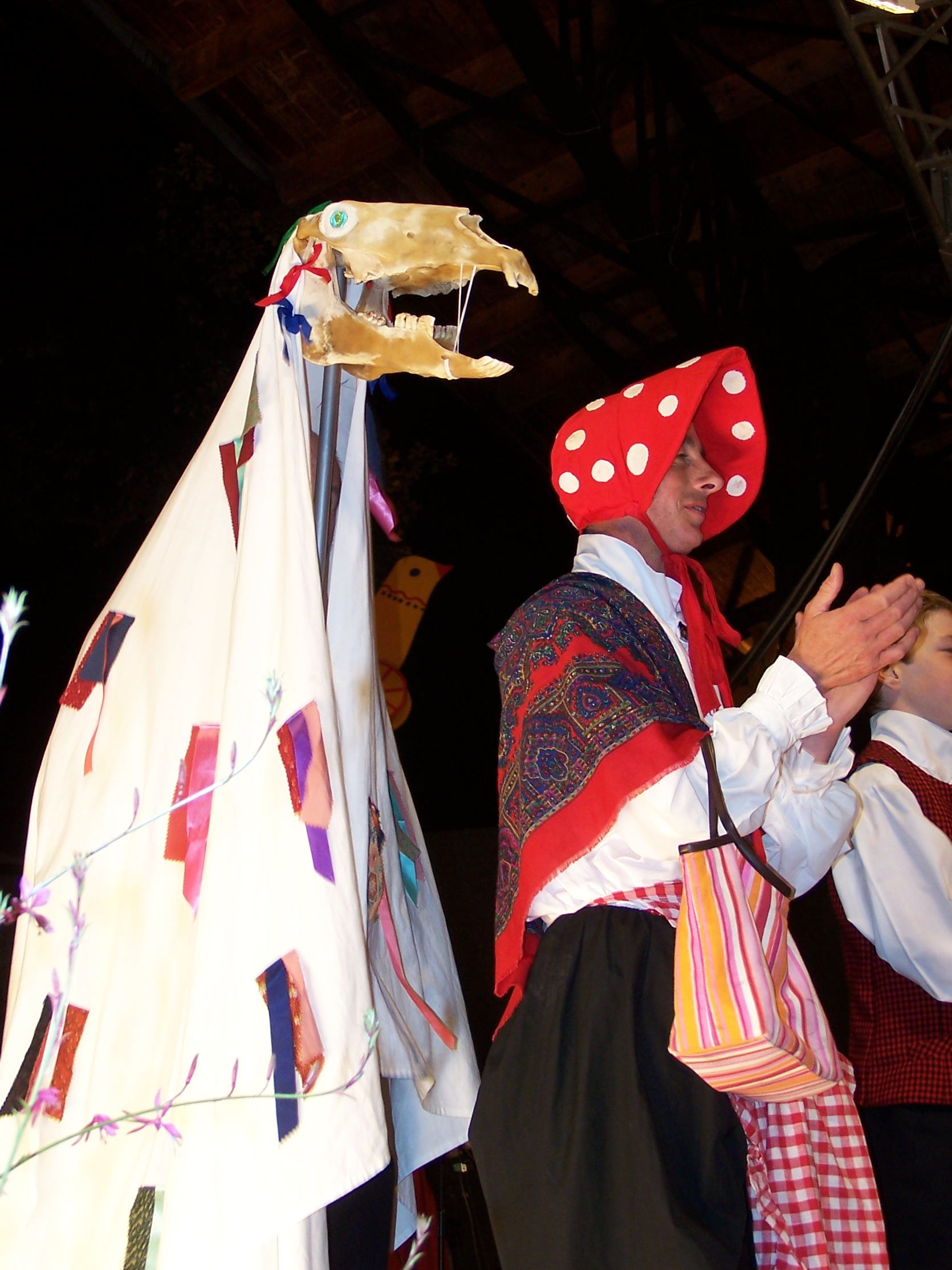
A Mari Lwyd, during a celebration in 2006

The Mari Lwyd itself consists of a horse's skull that is decorated with ribbons and affixed to a pole; to the back of the skull is attached a white sheet, which drapes down to conceal both the pole and the individual carrying this device. On occasion, the horse's head was represented not by a skull but was instead made from wood or even paper. In some instances, the horse's jaw was able to open and close as a result of string or lever attached to it, and there are accounts of pieces of glass being affixed into the eye sockets of some examples, representing eyes. An observer of the tradition as it was performed at Llangynwyd during the nineteenth century noted that preparation for the activity was a communal event, with many locals involving themselves in the decorating of the Mari Lwyd.

The Mari Lwyd custom was performed during winter festivities, specifically around the dates of Christmas and New Year. However, the precise date on which the custom was performed varied between villages, and in a number of cases the custom was carried out for several consecutive nights. There is a unique example provided by an account from Gower in which the head was kept buried throughout the year, only being dug up for use during the Christmas season.

The custom used to begin at dusk and often lasted late into the night. The Mari Lwyd party consisted of four to seven men, who often had coloured ribbons and rosettes attached to their clothes and sometimes wore a broad sash around the waist. There was usually a smartly dressed "Leader" who carried a staff, stick, or whip, and sometimes other stock characters, such as the "Merryman" who played music, and Punch and Judy (both played by men) with blackened faces; often brightly dressed, Punch carried a long metal fire iron and Judy had a besom.

Wel dyma ni'n dwad (Well here we come)
Gy-feillion di-niwad (Innocent friends)
I ofyn am gennad (To ask leave)
I ofyn am gennad (To ask leave)
I ofyn am gennad i ganu (To ask leave to sing)

— A common opening to the pwnco.

The Mari Lwyd party would approach a house and sing a song in which they requested admittance. The inhabitants of the house would then offer excuses for why the team could not enter. The party would sing a second verse, and the debate between the two sides – known as the pwnco (a form of musical battle similar to flyting) – would continue until the house's inhabitants ran out of ideas, at which time they were obliged to allow the party entry and to provide them with ale and food. An account from Nantgarw described such a performance, in which the Punch and Judy characters would cause a noise, with Punch tapping the ground to the rhythm of the music and rapping on the door with a poker, while Judy brushed the ground, house walls, and windows with a broom. The householders had to make Punch promise that he would not touch their fireplace before he entered the building, otherwise it was the local custom that before he left he would rake out the fire with his poker. In the case from Llangynwyd, however, there was no interplay between the householders and troupe, but rather the latter were typically granted entry automatically after singing the first verse of their song.

Once inside, the entertainment continued with the Mari Lwyd running around neighing and snapping its jaws, creating havoc, frightening children (and perhaps even adults) while the Leader pretended to try to restrain it. The Merryman played music and entertained the householders. The folklorist Iorwerth Peate believed that in recorded examples from Glamorgan it was apparent that the Mari Lwyd custom had become "indistinguishable" from the practice of wassailing, although added that there were still some examples of wassailing that did not involve the Mari Lwyd. He added that links between Mari Lwyd and wassailing were also apparent from recorded examples in other part of Wales, thus opining that Mari Lwyd represented a variant of the wider wassailing custom that was found throughout Britain.

== Early development ==
=== Etymology ===
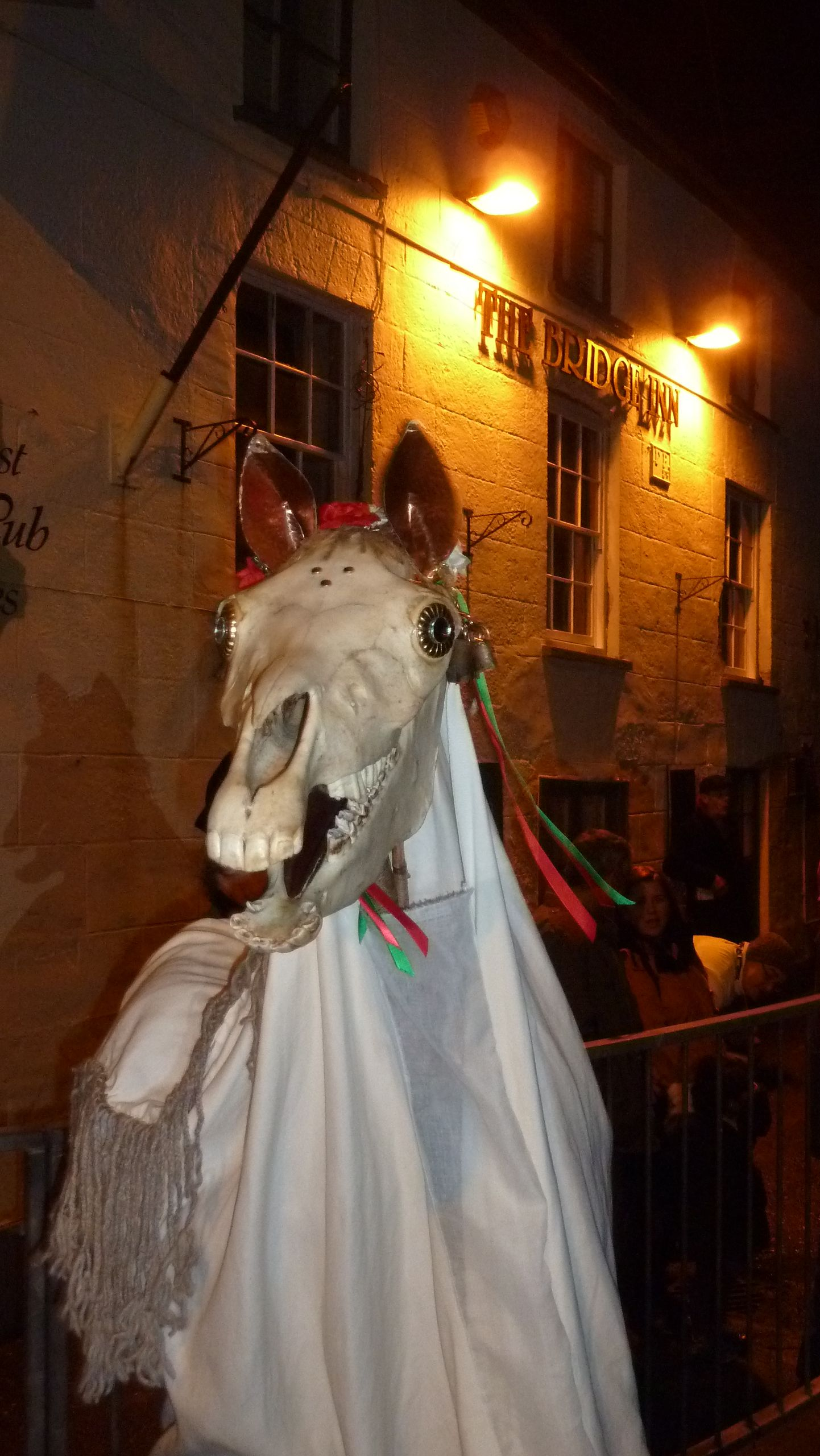
At the Chepstow Mari Lwyd, 2014

Although the custom was given various names, most recorded sources term this particular custom Mari Lwyd. Marie Trevelyan states that the name Marw Lwyd had been used in many parts of Wales since the seventeenth century. She derived this name as "Grey Death", arguing that it was a symbol of "the dying or dead year".

However, this etymology is heavy contested, Jones considered this to be a translation of "Blessed Mary", and thus a reference to the Virgin Mary, mother of Jesus, a key religious figure in Christianity. Although translating it slightly differently, as "Holy Mary", Peate endorsed this viewpoint. Although some of his acquaintances later suggested that the use of Mari for Mary was unknown in Wales prior to the Protestant Reformation, he countered these criticisms with the observation that the term Mari was being used in reference to the Virgin in the mid-14th century Black Book of Carmarthen, thus attesting to its early usage in Welsh. He nevertheless accepted that during the medieval period the term might have been restricted largely to poets, given that there is no evidence of its usage among the common dialect in this period.

Given that llwyd is the usual word for "grey" in the Welsh language and that Welsh speakers would have been exposed to the English word "mare", an alternative suggestion considered by Peate was that the term Mari Lwyd had originally meant "Grey Mare". This etymological explanation would have parallels with the name of a similar hooded horse tradition found in Ireland and the Isle of Man, which is known in Irish as the Láir Bhán and in Manx as the Laare Vane, in both cases meaning "White Mare". Initially believing that "there is much to be said for this suggestion", Peate later embraced it fully. Cawte similarly believed that "Grey Mare" was the most likely original meaning of the term, noting that the Mari Lwyd appeared to represent a horse and that similar hobby horse customs in neighbouring England, such as the hoodening tradition of East Kent, also made reference to horses with their name. Peate suggested that even if the term Mari Lwyd had originally referred to a "Grey Mare", it could still have come to be associated with Mary in popular folk culture following the Reformation, thus explaining why Mary is referred to in the lyrics of some surviving Welsh wassailing songs.

A further suggestion is that Mari Lwyd derives from the English term Merry Lude, referring to a merry game. Peate opposed this idea, arguing that if the latter was converted into Welsh then the result would be merri-liwt or merri-liwd. Peate also dismissed the idea that had been suggested to him that the term Mari in this context had derived from Morris, a reference to Morris dance. Another reason to doubt this idea is that there is no known historical link between the Mari Lwyd, which was found in South Wales, and the Morris dance, which was concentrated in the north of the country.

In other recorded instances, the Mari Lwyd custom is given different names, with it being recorded as y Wasail "The Wassail" in parts of Carmarthenshire. In the first half of the 19th century it was recorded in Pembrokeshire under the name of y March "The Horse" and y Gynfas-farch "The Canvas Horse". One account from West Glamorgan has the head termed the aderyn bee [bi?] y llwyd, meaning the "Grey Magpie", although this may be due to an error on the part of the recorder, who could have confused the horse's head for the aderyn pica llwyd, an artificial bird in a tree that was carried by wassailers in the same area.

Note that in modern Welsh, the Mari Lwyd is referred to with definite article y, which subsequently causes a soft mutation of m to f (Welsh pronunciation: [v]), rendering the form y Fari Lwyd.

=== Origins ===
Positing the custom to be "the survival of some ancient popular rite or ceremony", in 1888 David Jones suggested that its origins were Christian, and that it had once been part of the festivities of the Feast of the Ass, a commemoration of the flight into Egypt of Mary and Saint Joseph that was historically marked on 14 January. According to Jones' idea, the Mari Lwyd itself represented the donkey on which Mary rode during the story.

Peate was of the opinion that the Mari Lwyd was "no doubt a survival of a pre-Christian tradition" that had once been spread across Britain and other parts of Europe, and which – having survived the Christianisation of Britain – had been renamed Mari Lwyd in reference to the Virgin Mary during the Middle Ages. He expressed the view that the original custom had been "horrific in origin and intention" and that from an early date it had been connected to wassailing. Cawte concurred that it was "reasonable to accept" that the Mari Lwyd head had become attached to an independent wassailing tradition, but said that the connection to the Virgin Mary was unnecessary. Pearce also suggested the possibility that in parts of Glamorgan and Monmouthshire the Mari Lwyd tradition came under the influence of mystery plays, thus explaining why later recorded examples from those counties contained characters known as "the Sergeant" and the "Merryman".

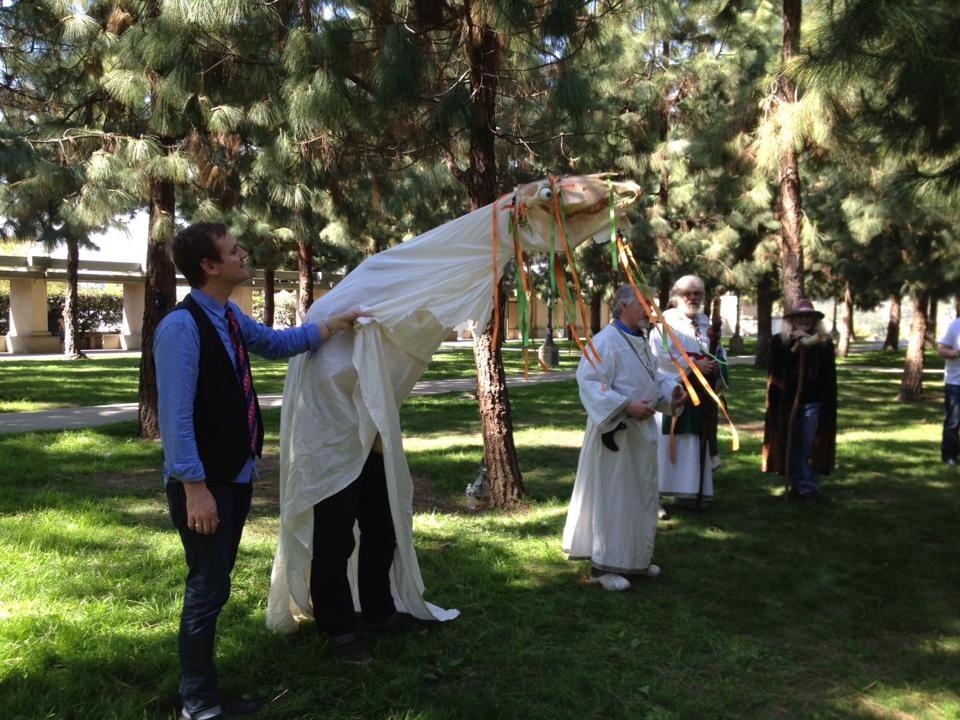
A Mari Lwyd at the 2013 St. David's Day festivities in Los Angeles

The folklorist Trefor M. Owen also suggested that the Mari Lwyd was a practice "which probably had a religious (if pre-Christian) origin", adding that by the time it had been recorded, it had become "emptied of its religious content". Also embracing Peate's suggestion of ancient origins, Ellen Ettlinger believed that the Mari Lwyd represented a "death horse", as symbolised by the white cloth worn by its carrier, suggesting that it was originally employed in a pre-Christian ritual to mark the festival of Samhain. The folklorist Christina Hole suggested that this "ancient character" was once "a bringer of fertility". However, after 1970 the folkloric trend for interpreting such hobby horse traditions as pre-Christian survivals had ended, as scholars came to express greater caution about proposing origins for such customs.

The Mari Lwyd was part of a wider "hooded animal" tradition that the folklorist E. C. Cawte identified as existing in different forms in various parts of Britain. Features common to these customs were the use of a hobby horse, the performance at Christmas time, a song or spoken statement requesting payment, and the use of a team who included a man dressed in women's clothing. A related example is the hoodening custom of East Kent in southeastern England. In an area along the border between Derbyshire and Yorkshire, the Old Tup tradition featured groups knocking on doors around Christmas carrying a hobby horse that had a goat's head. Hole drew parallels between hoodening and the Christmas Bull tradition recorded in Dorset and Gloucestershire. In south-west England, there are two extant hobby horse traditions—the Padstow 'Obby 'Oss festival and Minehead Hobby Horse—which take place not at Christmas time but on May Day. Although the origins of these traditions are not known with any certainty, the lack of any late medieval references to such practices may suggest that they emerged from the documented elite fashion for hobby horses in the sixteenth and seventeenth centuries. In this, the hooded animal traditions may be comparable to England's Morris dance tradition, which became a "nation-wide craze" in the sixteenth and seventeenth centuries before evolving into "a set of sharply delineated regional traditions".

== Regional coverage ==
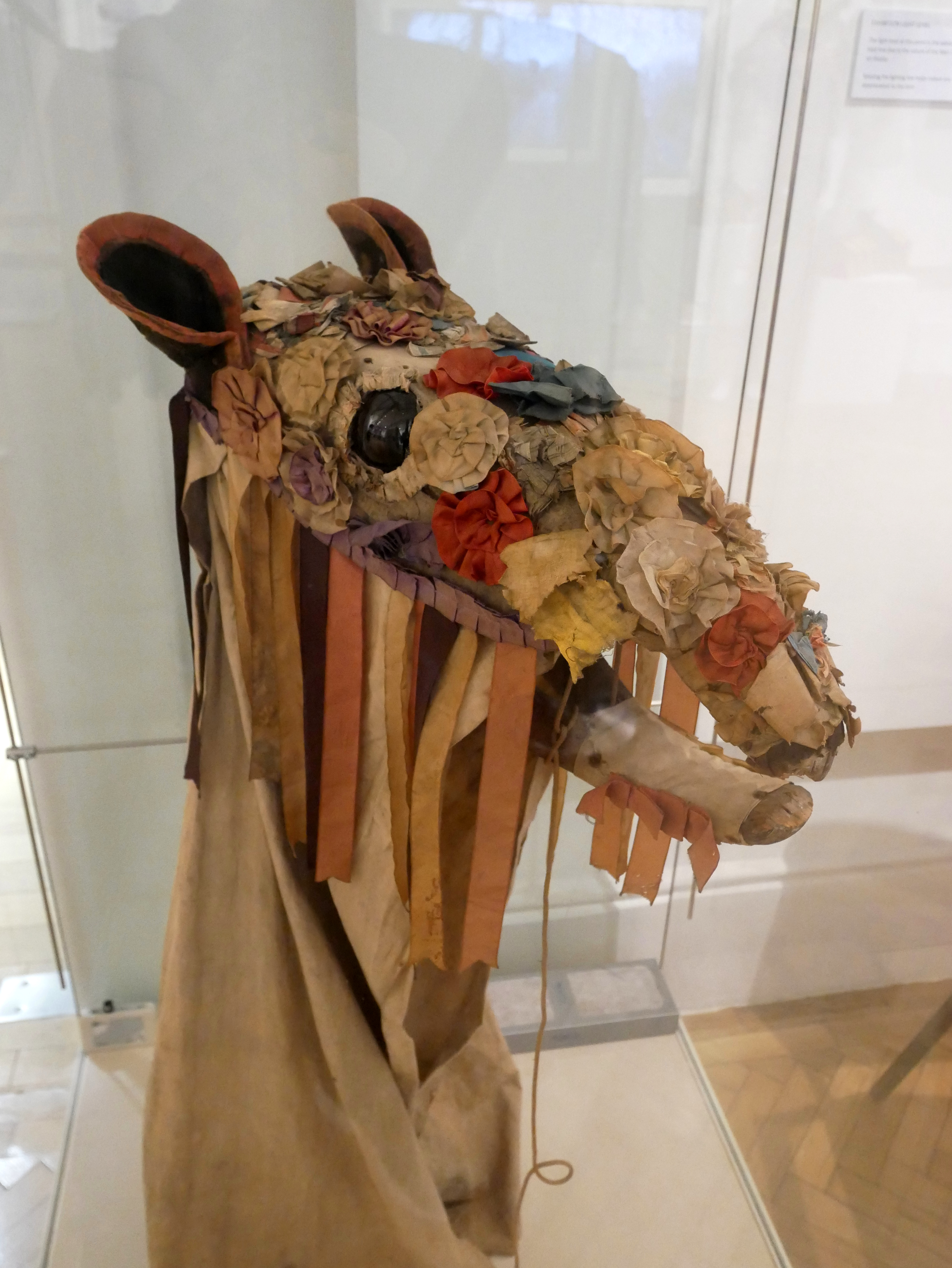
A 19th-century Mari Lwyd from Glamorgan in the Horniman Museum collection, Forest Hill, London

As late as 1909, Marie Trevelyan stated that the Mari Lwyd tradition at Llandaff remained an annual event, while a tradition at Trecynon, Aberdare continued into the twentieth century. However, she also records that by that time the Mari Lwyd of Llantwit Major (that would also visit several locations in the Vale of Glamorgan) had become "sporadic" and was no longer an annual tradition.

In mapping the distribution of Mari Lwyd appearances, Cawte noted that it was principally a custom associated with Glamorgan, with two-thirds of instances falling within that county. The custom stretched east into the industrial valleys of Monmouthshire, with the most easterly account coming from Monmouth itself; this account is also one of the earliest. A number of examples were also found in Carmarthenshire, with a single example found in both Brecknockshire and Ceredigion. There is a single record of the custom being performed in North Wales, in an example from Wrexham, which Cawte believed was the result of a Glamorgan man bringing the custom with him as he moved north. Previously, Peate had cautioned that the comparative absence of recorded examples from Mid and North Wales was not proof that the Mari Lwyd custom had never been present in those areas.

Cawte opined that there was "no clear reason" for the distribution of the Mari Lwyd custom, which cut through various local cultural features. Those areas where it was found did not correlate with any distinction between English-speaking and Welsh-speaking areas in South Wales. He acknowledged however that there was a "reasonable correspondence" between the areas in which the Mari Lwyd was recorded and the areas which were used for mineral production in the 14th century. He therefore suggested the possibility that it might have been performed by coal and iron miners in western Glamorgan, Carmarthenshire, and western Monmouthshire, and that from there it could have spread into those villages where goods were manufactured using those minerals.

== Recorded appearances ==
=== 18th and 19th centuries ===
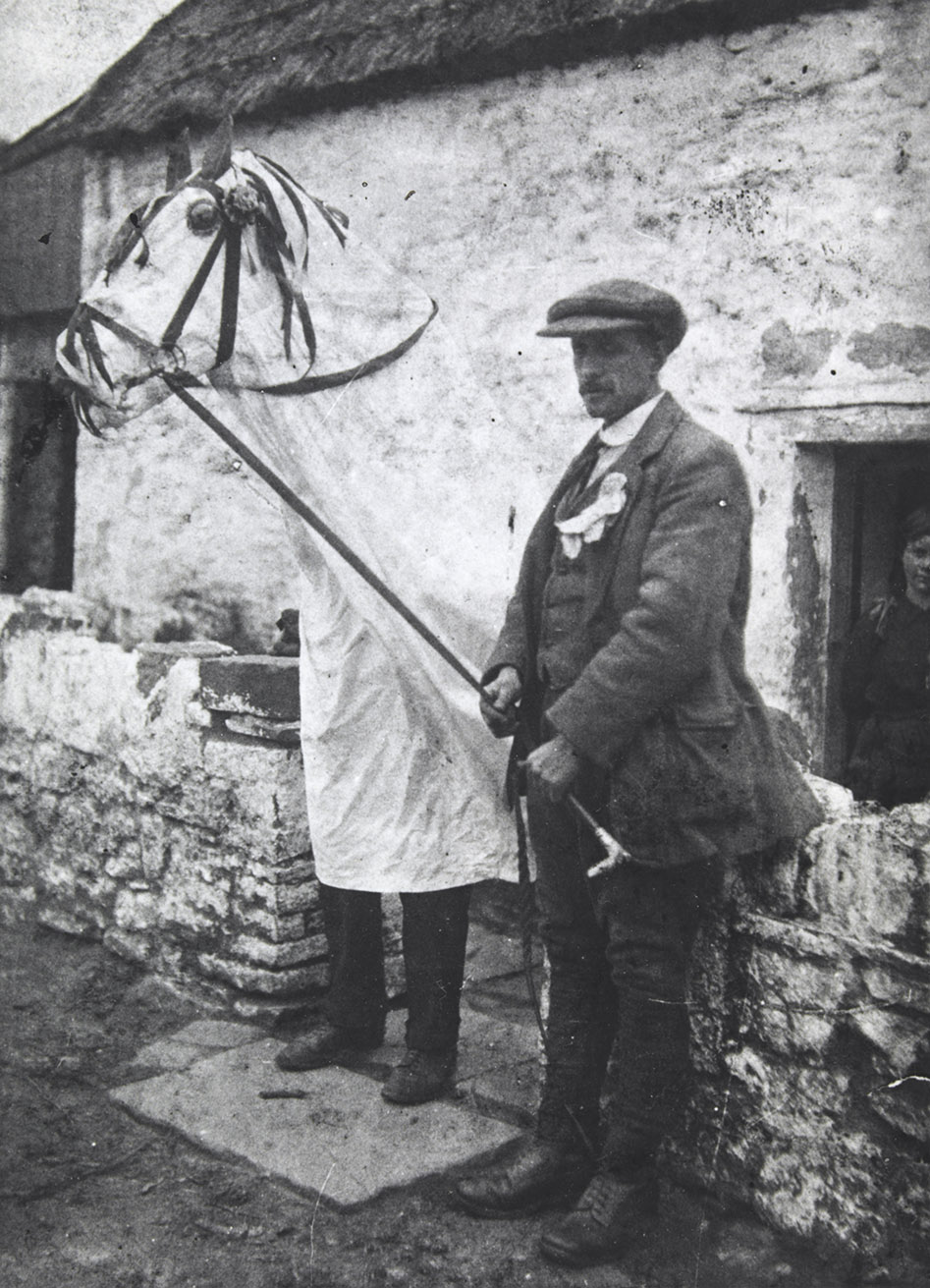
Two photographs of the Mari Lwyd from Llangynwyd, Glamorgan, during the early 20th century. The left image was taken between 1904 and 1910, and the one on the right between c.1910 and 1914.

The earliest published account of the Mari Lwyd appeared in 1800 in J. Evans' A Tour through Part of North Wales, in the year 1798, and at Other Times. Although the book itself focused on North Wales, the chapter in which the passage was included discussed the language and customs of Wales more generally. In this section, Evans related that:

A man on new year's day, dressing himself in blankets and other trappings, with a factitious head like a horse, and a party attending him, knocking for admittance, this obtained, he runs about the room with an uncommon frightful noise, which the company quit in real or pretended fright; they soon recover, and by reciting a verse of some cowydd, or, in default, paying a small gratuity, they gain admission.

Evans returned to the custom in his 1804 work Letters Written During a Tour Through South Wales, in the year 1803, and at Other Times. Here he provided a clearer discussion than before, making it apparent that teams accompanying a man dressed as a horse or bull toured the local area from Christmas until after Twelfth Day, and that they were given food or money to leave the householders alone.

The Mari Lwyd next appeared in an 1819 account from West Glamorgan, where the Mari Lwyd itself was termed an Aderyn Bee y llwyd (roughly "Grey Magpie") and was accompanied by "three or four partners in the profits of the expedition, who are by turns horse, groom, or attendants".

It has been suggested that the Welsh Methodist revival contributed to the decline of both the Mari Lwyd and a number of other Welsh folk customs. In 1802, the harpist Edward Jones of Merionethshire published a book in which he lamented the destructive impact that Christian preachers were having on Welsh folk customs, which they were criticising as sinful. In his view, "the consequence is, Wales, which was formerly one of the merriest and happiest countries in the World, is now becoming one of the dullest". Reflecting such a view, in 1852 the Reverend William Roberts, a Baptist minister at Blaenau Gwent, condemned the Mari Lwyd and other related customs as "a mixture of old Pagan and Popish ceremonies... I wish of this folly, and all similar follies, that they find no place anywhere apart from the museum of the historian and antiquary."

Owen suggested that the custom's decline was also a result of changing social conditions in South Wales. He argued that the Mari Lwyd wassailing custom "gave an approved means of entering the houses of neighbours in a culture in which there were few public assemblies – at least in the heart of winter – in which the convivial spirit of the season could be released". Further, he suggested that the gifts of food, drink, and sometimes money "no doubt helped to further the feeling of community among country folk while at the same time manifesting it". He argued that the changing social conditions altered the ways that people in southern Wales celebrated Christmas, hence contributing to the folk custom's decline.

=== 20th century revival ===
In a 1935 article on the subject of the Mari Lwyd, Peate stated that the tradition "is still met with; it is practised in the Cardiff district, Bridgend, Llangynwyd, Neath and other Glamorgan districts". He highlighted an example from Christmas Eve 1934, in which a Mari Lwyd was observed performing alongside at least twelve singers in a chemist's shop in the Mumbles, Swansea. Ettlinger subsequently expressed the view that "Dr. Peate deserves the sincerest gratitude of all folk-lore students for having so valiantly penetrated the mysteries surrounding the Mari Lwyd."

Footage of a pwnco on the steps of Chepstow Museum in 2014

The historian Ronald Hutton stated that the Mari Lwyd tradition appeared to have become defunct in the early 20th century. In the middle of that century it was revived in Llangynwyd. In 1967, Lois Blake published a letter in the journal English Dance and Song in which she noted that the Mari Lwyd appeared each Christmas Eve at the Barley Mow Inn at Graig Penllyn, near Cowbridge, where a man named John Williams had kept the custom alive for the past sixty years. Blake also explained that she believed that the custom was still performed at several villages in the Maesteg area of Glamorgan. During the 1970s, Hole commented that the tradition was still found in Glamorganshire and Carmarthenshire.

During the 1980s, further revived forms of the Mari Lwyd tradition emerged in Caerphilly, Llantrisant, and St Fagans, all of which are in the same borderland between Vale and mountains. Commenting on the example of Llantrisant, which was inaugurated in 1980, Mick Tems noted that the custom had "re-established herself so strongly that there are complaints if she misses any of her regular calls". He noted that in 1991 the Llantrisant Mari Lwyd was taken to Yn Chruinnaght, a Pan-Celtic festival on the Isle of Man, and that it had also been taken to the Lowender Peran festival at Perranporth in Cornwall. Hutton believed that the custom re-emerged in the borderlands between Vale and the mountains in part because people in Glamorgan sought to reaffirm their sense of cultural identity during the termination of their traditional industries, and partly because the Welsh Folk Museum was located in the area. More widely, he believed that the revival of the Mari Lwyd was in large part due to the "forces of local patriotism", noting that a similar situation had resulted in the resurrection of the hoodening tradition in East Kent.

The Mari Llwyd is a feature in modern celebrations of the Hen Galan (English: Old New Year), such as those at Cowbridge, Cwm Gwaun and Aberystwyth. The town council of Aberystwyth also organised "The World's Largest Mari Lwyd" for the Millennium celebrations in 2000.

A mixture of the Mari Lwyd and Wassail customs occurs in the border town of Chepstow, South Wales, every January. A band of English Wassailers meet with the local Welsh Border Morris Side, The Widders, on the bridge in the town. In the 21st century, the revival of the custom has extended to Abergavenny.

== In culture ==
Mari Lwyd, Lwyd Mari
A sacred thing through the night they carry.
Betrayed are the living, betrayed the dead
All are confused by a horse's head.

— Vernon Watkins, "Ballad of the Mari Lwyd", lines 398–400

The Mari Lwyd has prompted responses from the arts in Wales. In 1941 Faber & Faber published "Ballad of the Mari Lwyd and other poems, then first book by poet Vernon Watkins. The Archbishop of Canterbury Rowan Williams has written that the title ballad, "one of the outstanding poems of the century, draws together the folk-ritual of the New Year, the Christian Eucharist, the uneasy frontier between living and dead, so as to present a model of what poetry itself is – frontier work between death and life, old year and new, bread and body."

The Mari Lwyd was utilised by the artist Clive Hicks-Jenkins in a series of drawings from around 2000 that focused on a metamorphosing horse/man as a nightmarish harbinger of his father's death. Catriona Urquhart wrote a sequence of poems titled The Mare's Tale which were published alongside Hicks-Jenkins' images in 2001. In her 1977 novel Silver on the Tree, the author Susan Cooper included an appearance from the Mari Lwyd.

In a 2024 episode of RuPaul's Drag Race UK, drag contestant Marmalade referenced the Mari Lwyd in her outfit as a means of representing her home town of Pontyclun.

In The Wonderfully Weird World of Gumball episode The Amadain, one of Penny Fitzgerald's family members' is directly based on the Mari Lwyd.

== Related Welsh customs ==
In 1919, H. W. Evans recorded the existence of a similar custom which had existed in Solva, Pembrokeshire circa 1840, during his mother's childhood. He stated that this custom entailed the use of what he termed a "Mari Lwyd", furthermore providing a drawing of it using his mother's recollections as a basis, although was unaware of how this costume had been used. According to Evans' description, this Mari Lwyd consisted of a sheet that had been sewn together along two adjacent sides to make a cone, which was then stuffed with hay and decorated with buttons for eyes and harvest gloves for ears, thus resembling an animal's snout. An individual could conceal themselves under the sheet and use a hay fork inserted into the hay to hold it up. A similar custom appears in an account from 1897, in which an entity known as the Bwca Llwyd ("Grey Bogy") was described; it involved an imitation horse's head being made from canvas and stuffed with hay, being carried about using a hay fork on All Hallow's Eve.

Cawte also noted the example of other Welsh folk customs featuring the head of a horse, however he opined that these "so not seem to be closely related to the mari lwyd". A horse's head was prepared in a manner akin to the Mari Lwyd for a spring festival known as the mynwenta or pynwenta, which took place in Pembrokeshire circa 1820. As part of this festival, young men and women gathered at a mill for a night's entertainment. In the late nineteenth century, a tradition was recorded in North Wales that was known as "giving a skull", in which the skull of a horse or donkey was placed over the front door of a woman's house on May Day as a sign of contempt. In parts of Wales a horse's head – sometimes with horns attached – was featured as part of the charivari processions designed to shame those who were deemed to have behaved in an immoral manner.
