= Old Ball =

Folk custom in Lancashire, England

Old Ball is a folk custom that existed in the Forest of Rossendale in Lancashire, north-western England during the nineteenth century. The tradition entailed the use of a hobby horse that is mounted on a pole and carried by an individual hidden under a sackcloth. It represents a regional variation of a "hooded animal" tradition that appears in various forms throughout the UK.

The Lancashire Old Ball custom differs from other animal head traditions in Britain by being associated with Easter; most of the others were instead carried out at Christmas time. Demonstrating potential links to other regional traditions is the use of the name "Ball" for hobby horses in other areas. At Ashford and Little Hucklow in Derbyshire, the Old Horse tradition was recorded as using hobby horses named "Ball", while at Alderley Edge in Cheshire, the hobby horse was called "Young Ball".

== Description ==
The Old Ball tradition took place around Easter. The term "Ball" or "Old Ball" was the name of the hobby horse that featured in it. This hobby horse consisted of a horse skull affixed to a pole, with the bottom of glass bottles for eyes. The pole was carried by a man hidden beneath a sackcloth, and there was sometimes a tail affixed to the outfit.

The hobby horse was taken around by a group of about six men, who disguised themselves by blackening their faces or wearing masks. This group sang a song, although its lyrics and tune were not recorded. Old Ball itself would chase people in order to obtain money from them.

== History and regional distribution ==
The southern point of the custom's distribution lies near the foothills of the Forest of Rossendale. It was also recorded in neighbourhoods of Blackburn and Burnley, near the northern margins of that forest about 15 to 20 miles north. All of the settlements in which it was recorded were industrial towns; those in the south were mostly connected to cotton spinning, while the two in the north were associated with cotton weaving.

Recorded accounts of the Old Ball tradition all come from the first three quarters of the nineteenth century.

Old Ball was part of a wider "hooded animal" tradition that the folklorist E. C. Cawte identified as existing in different forms in various parts of Britain. Features common to these customs were the use of a hobby horse, the performance at Christmas time, a song or spoken statement requesting payment, and the use of a team who included a man dressed in women's clothing. In South Wales, the Mari Lwyd tradition featured troupes of men with a hobby horse knocking at doors over the Christmas period. In south-west England, there are two extant hobby horse traditions—the Padstow 'Obby 'Oss festival and Minehead Hobby Horse—which take place not at Christmas time but on May Day. Although the origins of these traditions are not known with any certainty, the lack of any late medieval references to such practices may suggest that they emerged from the documented elite fashion for hobby horses in the sixteenth and seventeenth centuries. In this, the hooded animal traditions may be comparable to England's Morris dance tradition, which became a "nation-wide craze" in the sixteenth and seventeenth centuries before evolving into "a set of sharply delineated regional traditions".
