= The Broad (folk custom) =

English folk custom

The Broad was a folk custom found in the Cotswolds, an area of south-central England, during the nineteenth and early twentieth centuries. The tradition entails the use of a hobby horse with a bull's head that is mounted on a pole and carried by an individual hidden under a sackcloth. It represents a regional variation of a "hooded animal" tradition that appears in various forms throughout the British Isles.

The Broad custom took place at Christmas time, with the folklorist Christina Hole referring to it as "the Christmas Bull". The Broad itself was reported as being made either from the stuffed skin of a bull's head or out of cardboard. In some cases, it had horns, glass eyes, and occasionally ribbons and rosettes. This was then affixed to a pole, held by an individual, who in some accounts was concealed under a sackcloth or sheet. There are two records, from Hawkesbury and Leighterton in Gloucestershire, in which the Broad consisted of a turnip or swede which had been hollowed out and had a candle placed within it. The Broad was usually featured as part of a wassailing team, but in some cases is recorded as appearing on its own, or as part of a hero-combat play. Those who accompanied it were reported as being dressed in ordinary clothing. Sometimes they carried a wooden wassail bowl which was decorated with ribbons and sprigs of evergreen.

The tradition was located in a triangular area bounded by Stroud, Cricklade, and Chipping Sodbury. This area lay across the eastern end of the southern Cotswolds as well as just east of the Cotswolds itself. Within this area, it was reported as existing in ten villages in Gloucestershire, and three in Wiltshire.

The historian Ronald Hutton suggested that the custom might have developed out of older wassailing traditions.

The earliest recorded examples of the Broad came from Kingscote circa 1835, and in West Gloucestershire from between 1830 and 1840. Records of the tradition became rare after the outbreak of the First World War in 1914. Hutton noted that the tradition had neither survived nor been revived. Much of the folklore involving the Broad was collected by R. P. Chidlaw, who supplied it to the folklorist E. C. Cawte, who then made mention of it in his 1978 monograph on ritual animal disguises in British folklore.

== See also ==
- Mari Lwyd, a similar rite practised in South Wales.
- Hoodening, a similar rite practised in Kent.
