= The Derby Ram =

Traditional song

Old Tup at Handsworth, South Yorkshire, taken before 1907

"The Derby Ram" or "As I was Going to Derby" is a traditional tall tale English folk song (Roud 126) that tells the story of a ram of gargantuan proportions and the difficulties involved in butchering, tanning, and otherwise processing its carcass.

The song is claimed by some folk enthusiasts to have developed from ancient pagan rituals involving the worship of rams, but there is no real evidence of this. In the Derby area, it was associated with the "Old Tup" custom, a form of hoodening. The song appeared in print about 1790. It became extremely popular in Britain by the early nineteenth century, and naturally traveled to North America with settlers; a "Derby Ram Tavern" was located in Philadelphia by 1798 It was asserted in 1876 that George Washington had sung it to children. Because of its popularity, the city of Derby has adopted ram imagery in its architecture and for its sports teams.

== History ==
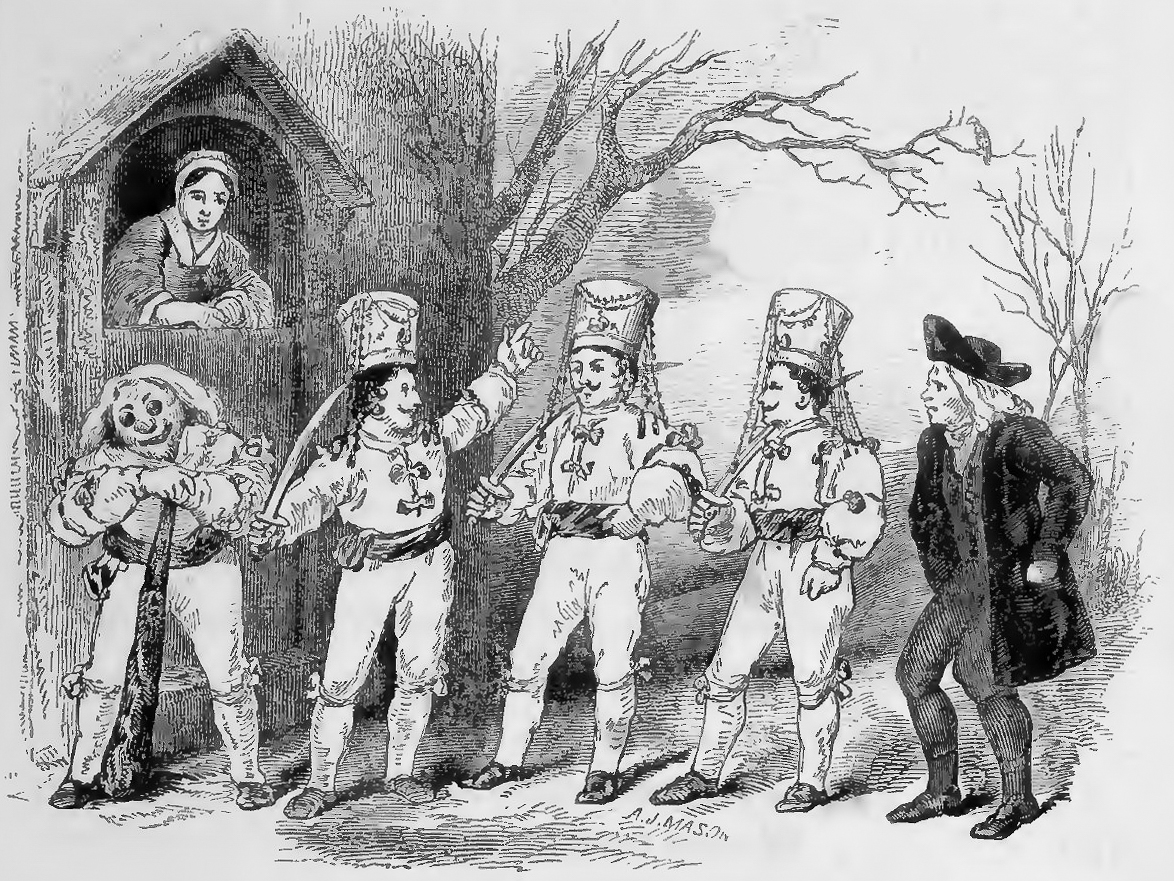
1852 depiction of mummers

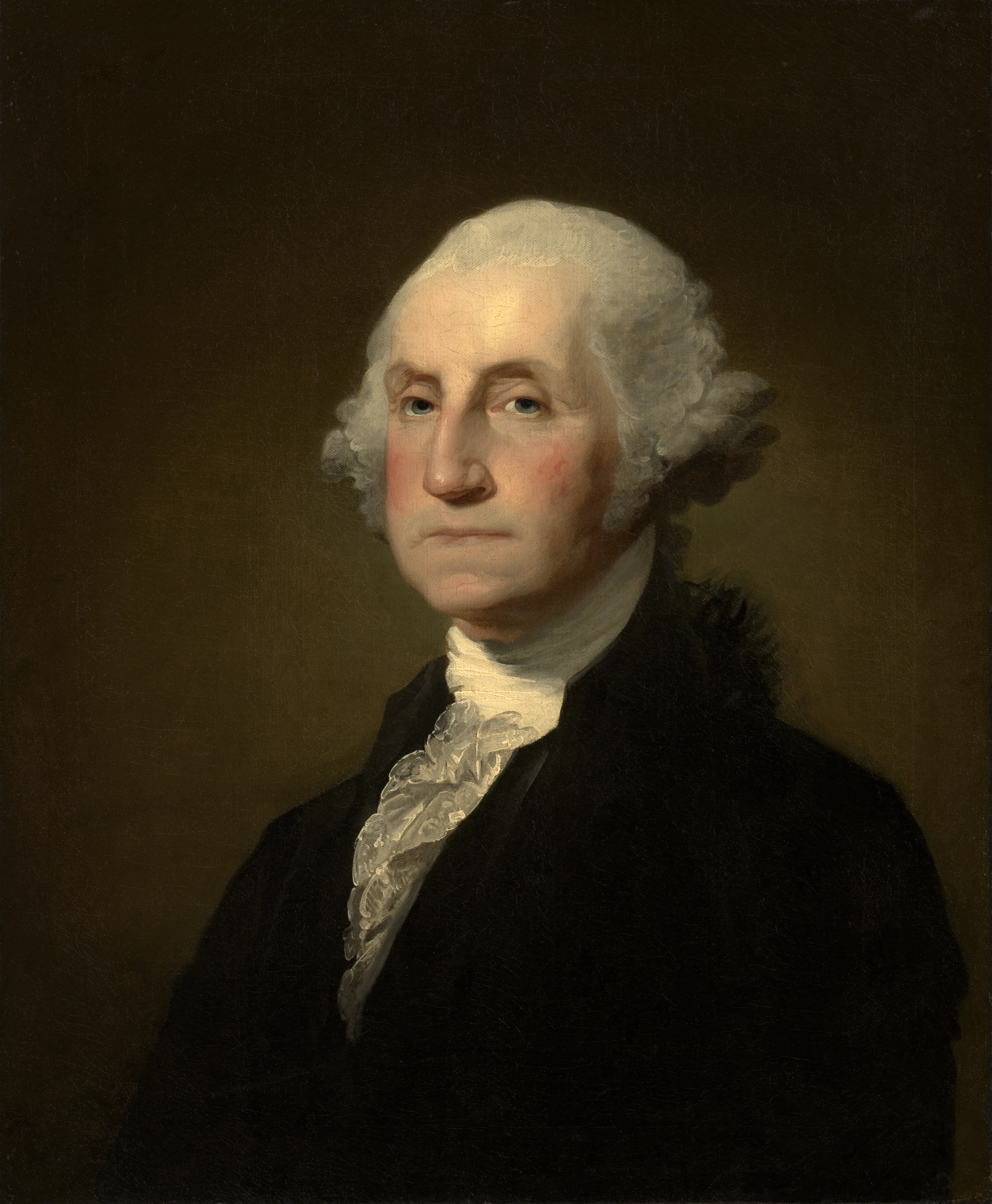
George Washington (1732–1799)

=== Possible origins and related traditions ===
A.L. Lloyd conjectured that the ram (also known as "Old Tup") may be "a distinct relative of the Greek god Pan" or a representation of "the Devil himself".

The tradition may have originated as an Anglo Saxon pagan midwinter ram-ritual (most prevalent in the North Midlands and South Yorkshire), which involved a singing and dancing procession of men accompanying a figure dressed as a sacred animal (often a goat or a ram) which it is sometimes said represented a life-giving, seed-proliferating god. This tradition may have survived as the Abbots Bromley Horn Dance.

As the Christianisation of England took place, any presumed religious aspect would have faded but the celebrations could have remained; the procession became a means of raising beer-money. A.L. Lloyd stated that the song was sung by village youths who travelled house-to-house at midwinter (as with many other traditions such as wassailing and souling), one of whom was "dressed in sheepskin to represent the old Tup". At this point, Tup still "had the power to confer or withhold good luck for the coming year" and, says Lloyd, was linked to fertility.

In the Middle Ages, mummers performed plays which involved far-fetched tales and men dressed as animals, which conceivably included the Derby ram. In parts of Derbyshire, plays involving the song are still performed as part of the "Old Tup" hoodening tradition.

=== Early written accounts ===
In 1739, the vicar of St. Alkmund's Church, Derby, wrote at the end of a letter to his son, "And thus I conclude this long story; almost as long a tale as that of the Derby Ram", which indicates that folklore about a Derby ram, though not necessarily the song, was known at least in Derby in the early eighteenth century.

Llewellyn Jewitt wrote about the song in his The Ballads and Songs of Derbyshire (1867), asserting that song had been alluded to for at least a century.

By one account, US President George Washington once sang "The Derby Ram" to the twin sons of Oliver Ellsworth, William Wolcott Ellsworth and Henry Leavitt Ellsworth (b. 1791), while staying at the Reeves – Wright mansion home in 1796 during one of his visits to Hartford, Connecticut.

== Traditional recordings ==
Countless variants of the song have been recorded from people throughout the English speaking world.

=== England ===
Charlie Wills of Symondsbury, Dorset was recorded singing a lively rendition to Peter Kennedy in 1952. Dozens of other traditional English singers from all over England have been recorded singing variants of the song, including William Rew of Devon (1954), Ben Baxter of Norfolk (1955), Kathleen Gentle of Westmorland (1968), Adge Blackburn of Lincolnshire (1970), Les Hartley of Yorkshire (1975), Bob Mills of Hampshire (1981), and naturally many traditional singers in Derbyshire.

=== Scotland ===
The song appears to have been popular in Scotland. The traditional singer Jeannie Robertson sang a version learnt from her mother to Hamish Henderson in 1960, which can be heard on the Tobar an Dualchais website. Alan Lomax recorded a singer named Arthur Lennox of Aberdeen singing a version to in 1949, which he learnt from his father and was known to be performed by his great-grandfather; the recording can be heard via the Alan Lomax archive. James Madison Carpenter recorded several versions in the 1920s and 1930s, around northeastern England and Scotland, all of which can be heard on the Vaughan Williams Memorial Library website.

=== Ireland ===
Irish traditional singer Robert Cinnamond sang "Derby Ram" in 1955, whilst Danny Brazil of Gloucestershire, England, sang a version called "Salsbury Ram" learnt from his Irish traveller parents.

=== United States and Canada ===
Since the eighteenth century when George Washington sang the song, many versions have remained in the oral tradition of rural Americans. Notable American performers of the song include the famous Appalachian singer Jean Ritchie, who sang her family version to Alan Lomax in 1949, which can be heard online. Fellow Appalachians Bascam Lamar Lunsford (1928, 1937 and 1956), Fiddlin' John Carson (1930), Doug Wallin (1983) also recorded versions learnt within their communities. Many other recordings were made in the southern United States, and Helen Hartness Flanders collected many versions in the New England region. Lots of traditional recordings were also made throughout Canada by folklorists such as Helen Creighton, Edith Fowke and Kenneth Peacock.

== Impact on the city of Derby ==
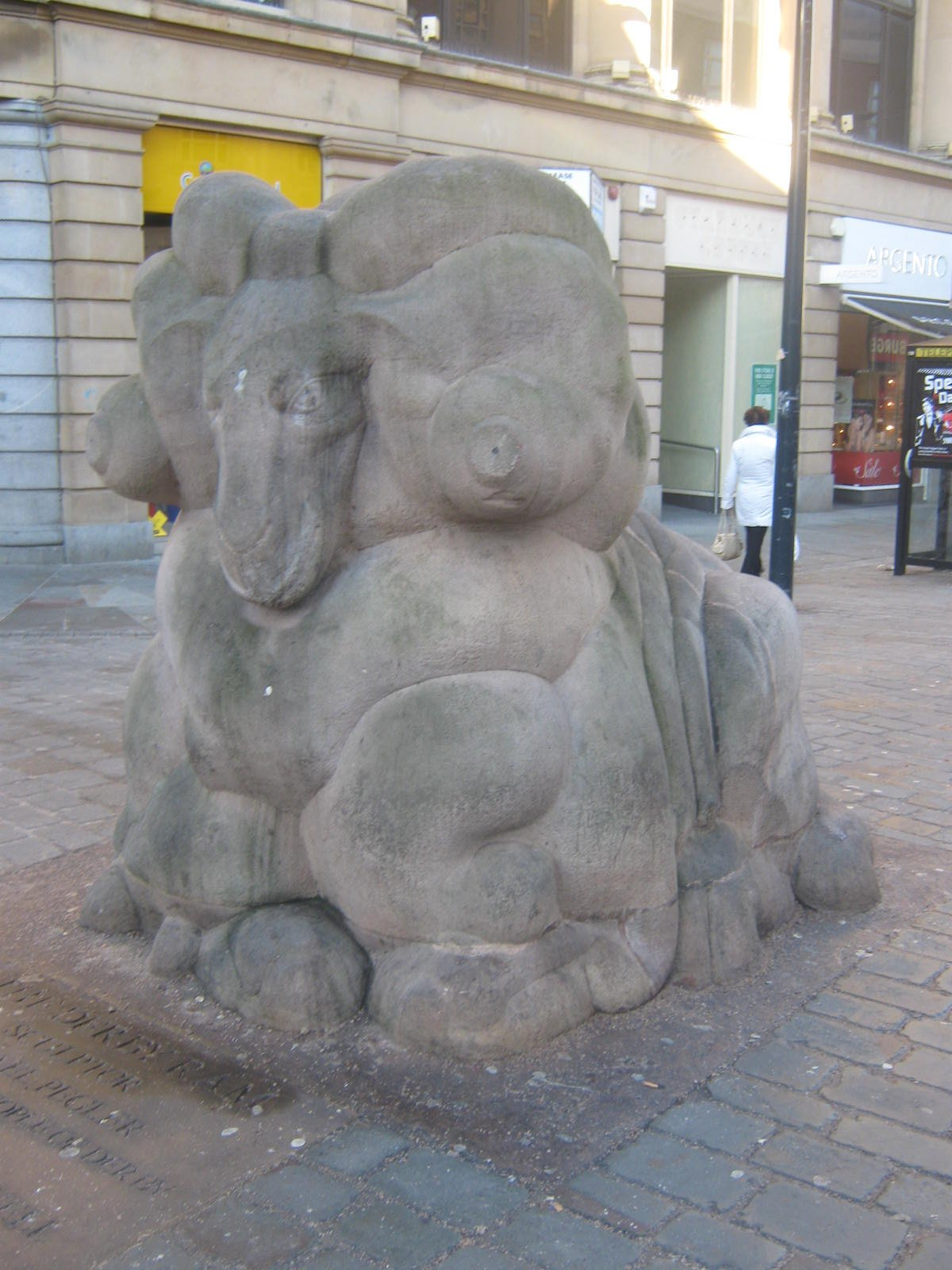
Representation of the ram in East Street, Derby

The song has given rise to the association of a ram with the city of Derby and the ram has been used by a number of groups based there. In 1855, the First Regiment of Derbyshire Militia adopted a ram as their mascot and the ballad as their regimental song, a tradition that continued into the 95th Derbyshire Regiment, and subsequently the Sherwood Foresters Regiment, Worcestershire and Sherwood Foresters Regiment, and Mercian Regiment, through regimental amalgamations.

Similarly, the football team, Derby County F.C. (nicknamed "The Rams") have taken the ram as their club mascot.

There are a number of References to a ram throughout the architecture of Derby – perhaps the most notable is a large street sculpture on the junction of East Street and Albion Street by Michael Pegler.

The coat of arms of Derby had a crest of a Derby Ram added in 1939.

== Traditional lyrics ==
The following version is the one transcribed by Llewellynn Jewitt in The Ballads and Songs of Derbyshire (1867). The first three stanzas of this version are sung thus:

As I was going to Derby, Sir,

All on a market day,

I met the finest Ram, Sir,

That ever was fed on hay.

Daddle-i-day, daddle-i-day,

Fal-de-ral, fal-de-ral, daddle-i-day.

This Ram was fat behind, Sir,

This Ram was fat before,

This Ram was ten yards high, Sir,

Indeed he was no more.

Daddle-i-day, etc.

The Wool upon his back, Sir,

Reached up unto the sky,

The Eagles made their nests there, Sir,

For I heard the young ones cry.

Daddle-i-day, etc.

== Popular versions ==
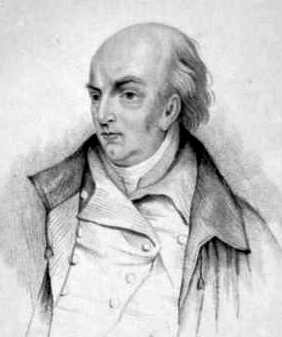
John Wall Callcott

The song was adapted by the English composer John Wall Callcott (1766–1821) into a 3 part glee. Merle Travis recorded a version of the song which was called "Darby's Ram".

The Kossoy Sisters also recorded a version titled "The Darby Ram" on their 1956 album Bowling Green.

A.L. Lloyd sang an upbeat version of "The Derby Ram" with banjo and chorus accompaniment on English Drinking Songs (1956).

British folk rock band Erland and the Carnival released a version of the song on their 2010 self-titled album, changing the lyrics to refer to a suicide which occurred in Derby in 2008.

Sweeney's Men released a version of the song as a single, "The Old Maid in the Garrett/Derby Ram" (Pye 7N 17312, 1967), also available on The Legend of Sweeney's Men compilation (2004).

The New Christy Minstrels released an adaptation based on the Darby Ram, "Down to Darby", on their 1963 album The New Christy Minstrels Tell Tall Tales! (Legends and Nonsense).

The song features as a sea shanty sung by pirates in the video game Assassin's Creed IV: Black Flag.

Windborne sang a version of the song in their 2024 album To Warm the Winter Hearth.
