= Láir Bhán =

Irish folk custom

Láir Bhán is a hobby horse that was part of a folk custom found in parts of Ireland, particularly in the area of County Kerry, in the eighteenth and nineteenth centuries.

The Irish term "Láir Bhán" translates as "White Mare". This meaning is identical, and the pronunciation similar, to the Manx hobby horse custom known as the Laare Vane. It also has similarities to the Welsh Mari Lwyd, a hobby horse found in southern Wales, which has been translated as "Grey Mare".

Most records of the tradition come from County Kerry. There are various reported instances in which the Láir Bhán accompanied the Wren Boys during their Christmastime activities.

An example of a Láir Bhán is in the collection of the National Museum of Ireland.

Although the origins of the hooded animal traditions in the British Isles are not known with any certainty, the lack of any late medieval references to such practices may indicate that they emerged from the documented elite fashion for hobby horses in the sixteenth and seventeenth centuries. In this, the hooded animal traditions may be comparable to England's Morris dance tradition, which became a "nation-wide craze" in the sixteenth and seventeenth centuries before evolving into "a set of sharply delineated regional traditions".
