= Old Tup =

English folk custom

An individual dressed as Old Tup, at Handsworth, some time prior to 1907

Old Tup, sometimes termed the Derby Tup or the Derby Ram, is a folk custom found in an area of the East Midlands of England. Geographically, the custom was found on the borders of Derbyshire and Yorkshire and stretched into part of Nottinghamshire. The tradition entails the use of a hobby horse with a goat's head that is mounted on a pole and carried by an individual hidden under a sackcloth. It represents a regional variation of a "hooded animal" tradition that appears in various forms throughout the British Isles. In geographical location and style it displays strong similarities with the Old Horse custom, but in the latter the hobby horse was presented as a horse rather than a ram.

As recorded from the mid-nineteenth through to the early twentieth centuries, Old Tup was a tradition performed at Christmas time. Men would form into teams to accompany Old Tup on its travels around the local area, and although the makeup of such groups varied, they typically included an individual identified as a butcher, a crossdresser, and Beelzebub. The team would carry Old Tup to local houses, where they would expect payment for their appearance. In some of these performances, the butcher would mime the killing of Old Tup, who would then fall to the floor.

The earliest record of the Old Tup custom comes from circa 1845. Various other records of it come from the latter half of the nineteenth and early twentieth centuries. Unlike other hooded animal traditions found elsewhere in Britain, the Old Tup custom does not appear to have died out at this point, and continued to be practised in the local area throughout the century.

== Description ==
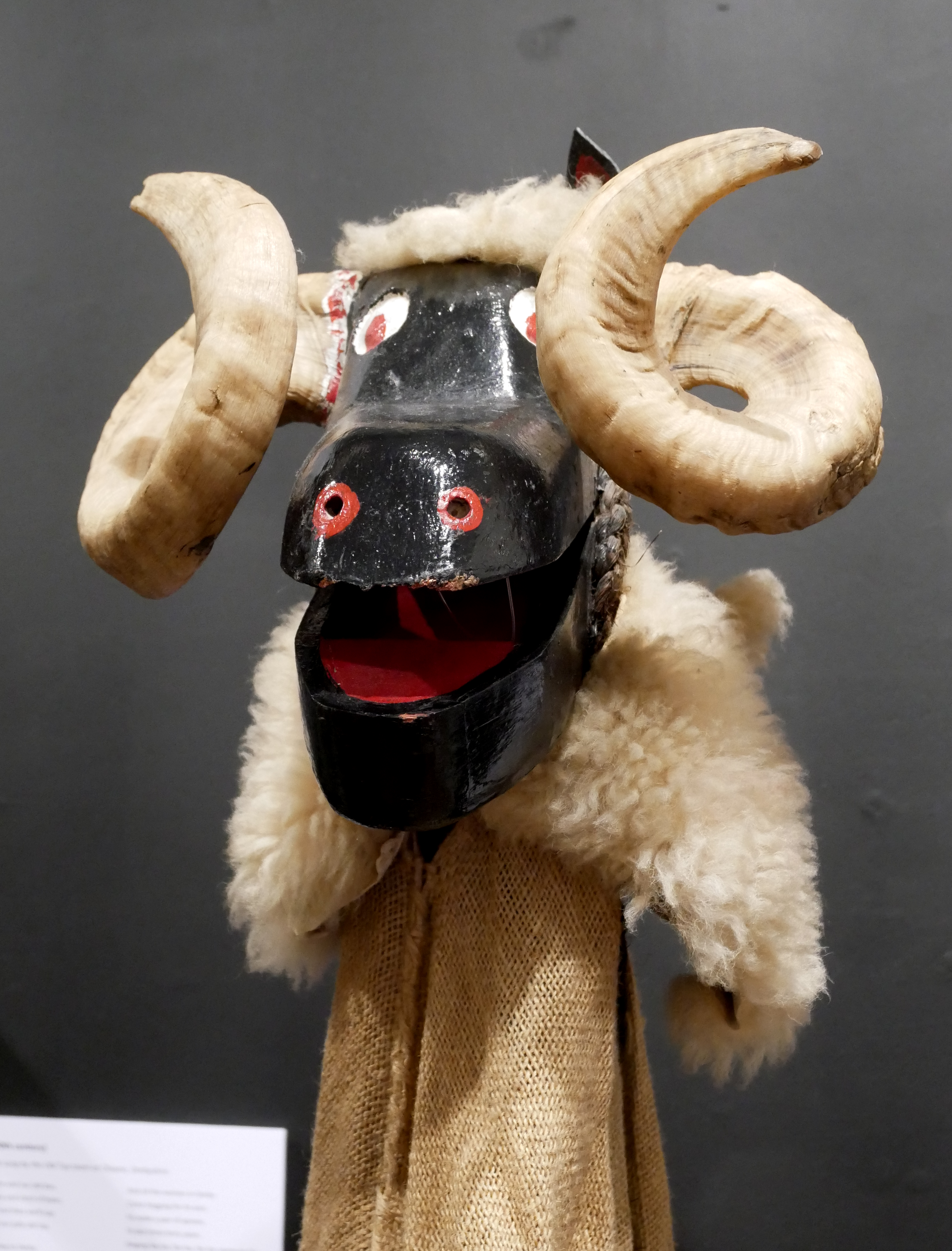
Tup created c.1985 and used by the Comberbach Mummers in Cheshire

Old Tup's head was described as being that of a sheep, and was often carved out of wood. In some instances, the wooden tongue of Old Tup was reported as having been painted red. In other instances, there were reports of a real sheep's head, as opposed to a wooden one, being used; these reports include complaints as to the smell of the head. In others, a combination of wooden and real elements were included, with a wooden frame covered by the horns and/or skin from a sheep's head. When the custom was carried out by children, sometimes simpler variants were used. At Pitsmoor, for example, there was an account produced of a child who had a sack placed over his head and whom was called "topsy". At Upperthorpe there was an account of a sack having its corners tied to resemble a sheep's horns.

The tradition generally took place at Christmas time. Sometimes, it was recorded as taking place on a specific day during this period, such as Christmas Eve, Christmas Day, or Boxing Day. In some recorded instances, particularly in Derbyshire, it took place on New Year's Eve or New Year's Day.

The troupe was made up of between four and six men and boys. Each took on a different character or role, and usually blackened their faces. The most common character in the troupe was the butcher, who wore a leather apron, knife, and steel. Other recurring characters were the old man and the old woman—the latter played by a man in women's clothing, sometimes carrying a broom—and figures referred to as Beelzebub and Little Devil Doubt. These were characters likely adopted from established Mummers plays. Some troupes included a boy or old man who carried a bowl in which to mime the catching of Old Tup's blood. Occasional characters that were sometimes included were the butcher's brother, the collector, and a leader for Old Tup. Some recorded instances also featured a blacksmith and his brother; these were stock characters in the Old Horse tradition which geographically overlapped that of Old Tup, and may be an element borrowed from the former by performers of the latter.

This troupe would travel around the settlement, knocking on doors and requesting admission. Once they had been admitted, Old Tup would either try to escape or would attack the assembled audience, while the troupe would sing a song known as "The Derby Tup". In some instances, the troupe would then receive money and leave. However, in about half of recorded instances, the troupe performed another act, in which the butcher mimed the killing of Old Tup—sometimes with one member miming the collecting of Old Tup's blood in a bowl—and Old Tup would fall to the ground. They would then get back up, and the group would leave.

=== "The Derby Tup" song ===
"The Derby Tup" or "The Derby Ram" was a popular song associated with the tradition that varied between performers. This song spread to the United States where it was sung by George Washington and passed through oral traditions to singers such as Jean Ritchie.

== Regional restrictions ==
The Old Tup tradition was recorded as being extant in an area of the East Midlands of England that was twenty miles across. This area straddles the border between Derbyshire and Yorkshire and also extends partly into Nottinghamshire. The city of Sheffield was in the centre of the area in which the tradition was recorded. The area of the tradition was bordered to the west by the moorland of the Peak District. 37 teams were recorded as existing in this area, averaging at one group every three miles. The tradition is much more sparsely recorded in the north of this area, perhaps suggesting that it was less prevalent in this region. The folklorist E. C. Cawte suggested that the northernmost account of the Old Tup tradition, in the city of Leeds, is unreliable. He noted that this account was describing a tradition that took place seventy years before, and may not have taken place in Leeds at all.

Old Tup was part of a wider "hooded animal" tradition that Cawte identified as existing in different forms in various parts of Britain. Features common to these customs were the use of a hobby horse, the performance at Christmas time, a song or spoken statement requesting payment, and the use of a team who included a man dressed in women's clothing. In South Wales, the Mari Lwyd tradition featured troupes of men with a hobby horse knocking at doors over the Christmas period. In south-west England, there are two extant hobby horse traditions—the Padstow 'Obby 'Oss festival and Minehead Hobby Horse—which take place not at Christmas time but on May Day.

== History ==
According to A.L. Lloyd, "Old Tup" may be "a distinct relative of the Greek god Pan" or "the Devil himself".

Although the origins of Britain's hooded animal traditions are not known with any certainty, the lack of any late medieval references to such practices may suggest that they emerged from the documented elite fashion for hobby horses in the sixteenth and seventeenth centuries. In this, the hooded animal traditions may be comparable to England's Morris dance tradition, which became a "nation-wide craze" in the sixteenth and seventeenth centuries before evolving into "a set of sharply delineated regional traditions".

The age of the tradition is not known. The earliest recorded example of the tradition came from Hemsworth circa 1845. "The Derby Tup" song is known from older period, with a sailor from New England having learned a version of it during the War of 1812.

Unlike other hooded animal traditions, the performance of the Old Tup custom did not die out during the twentieth century. By the 1970s, it was still recorded as a working-class tradition by which adolescents could earn extra money. In the 1970s, there were forty-one Old Tup troupes recorded as being active in north-east Derbyshire. These were rooted largely in certain families and performed their act in pubs and clubs. By this point, it had undergone some changes, with women now taking part. The historian Ronald Hutton described it as "the most noteworthy example of continuously performed regional 'folk-drama' in Britain".
