= Minehead Hobby Horse =

Folk custom in Somerset, England

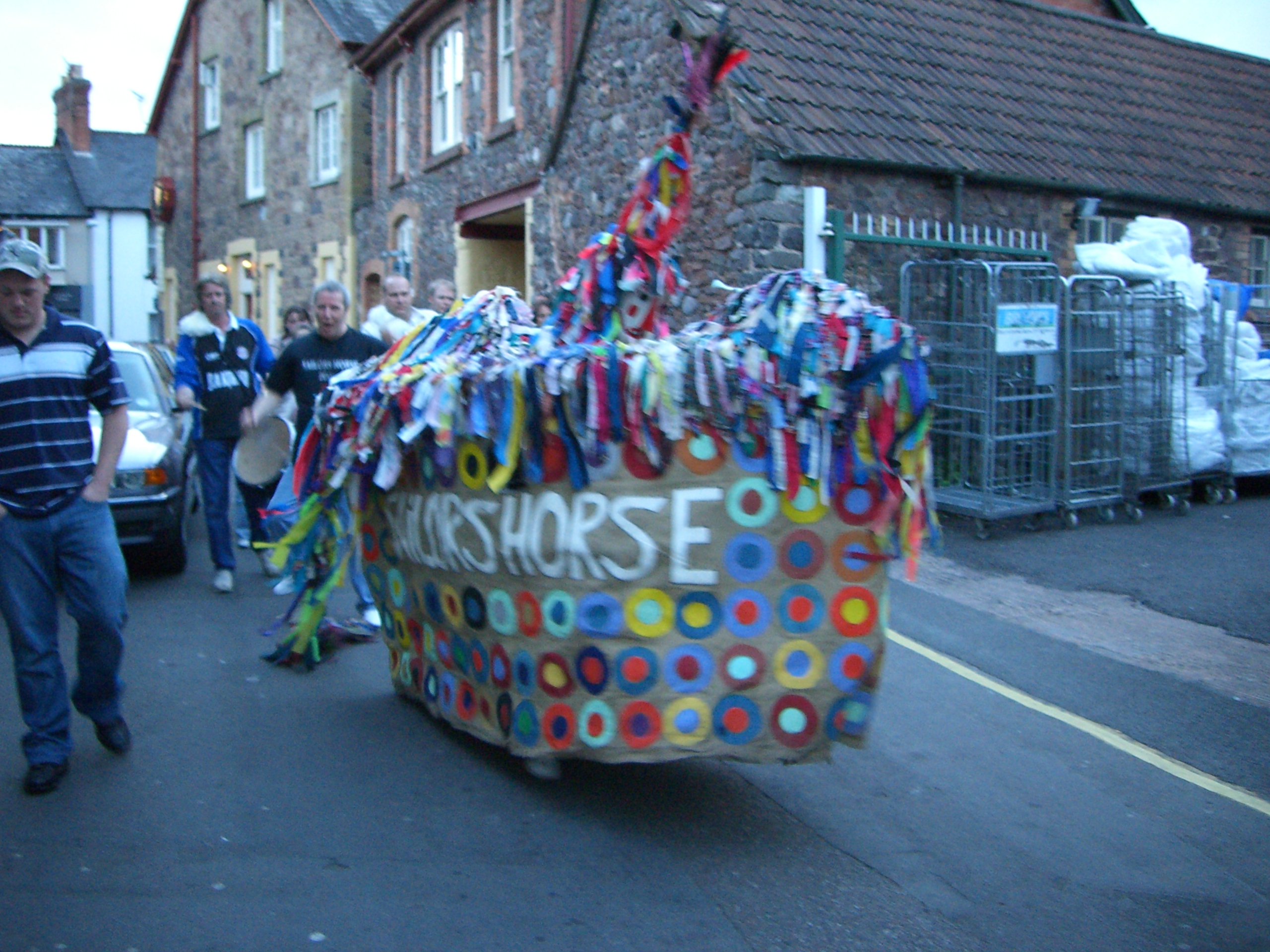
The Hobby Horse in 2008

In the coastal town of Minehead, located in the southwest English county of Somerset, there is a folk custom on May Day entailing the parading of a brightly decorated hobby horse around the locality.

The origins of the custom are unknown. The earliest known record of the practice dates from 1830.

== Description ==
The custom takes place during the evenings of the first three days of May, and involves the hobby horse perambulating the port of Minehead. The hobby horse measures eight feet in length and three feet in breadth, and consists of a frame covered in a cloth that has been painted with brightly coloured roundels and decorated with ribbons affixed along the top. The wording "Sailors Horse" is written in large capital letters across the side of the cloth. The head of the man carrying the horse protrudes from the middle of the frame; he wears a painted mask with a crested conical hood affixed with coloured ribbons. A tail made from rope is also affixed to the horse. The folklorist R. W. Patten observed that "if it were not for the tail, the whole contraption would resemble not so much a horse as a ship, and this perhaps is the key to the riddle".

== History ==
The Minehead hobby horse custom was first recorded in 1830. The folklorist E. C. Cawte suggested that the Minehead hobby horse custom may originally have been conducted around Christmas time before being transposed to May Day. As evidence, he noted that the majority of hobby horse customs in Britain—such as the Mari Lwyd in southern Wales and the hoodening of Kent—were associated with Christmas.

Up until 1913, there was only one recorded hobby horse in active use within the local area. The tradition was temporarily halted during the First World War, although in that period some local children made their own variant of the hobby horse. During the 1920s a second horse was reported as being in use, known as the Dunster Horse; Cawte thought that this was likely a copy of that at Minehead. Cawte also found two independent witnesses who reported that in living memory there had been a hobby horse custom at nearby Woodcombe.

The second horse was incorporated into the custom during the 1960s, initially known as the Alcombe Horse after Alcombe, where it was housed. In 1967 the Alcombe Horse troupe introduced a team of Gullivers, and in 1973 they painted the words "Minehead Horse" on the side of the hobby horse.

As of the 1970s, there was a second horse known as the Town Horse, which was owned by a man known as L. Pidgeon who lived in Alcombe; this hobby horse was brought to dance outside of the Hobby Horse Hotel with a team of Morris Men. In 1974, Patten stated that there had been a third hobby horse, the Dunster Horse, which had "died out" about fifty years previously but which had recently been revived. In the 1970s, Patten observed that the tradition "does not appear to have altered in essentials" from its early accounts.

== Links with other customs ==
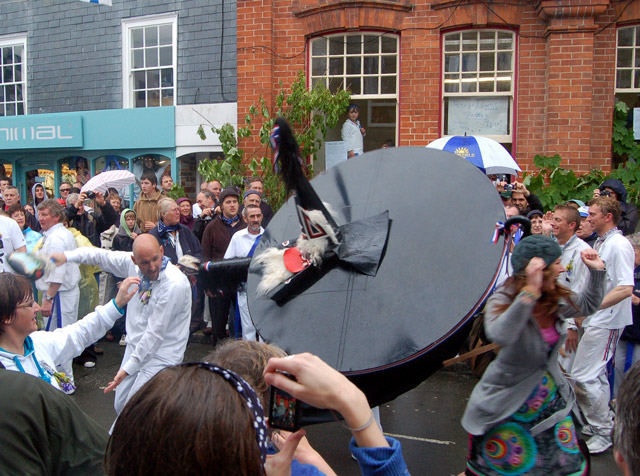
The Padstow 'Obby 'Oss

Minehead is located eighty miles away from the Cornish coastal town of Padstow, which has a similar May Day custom involving the procession of a hobby horse. The folklorist Christina Hole stated that while the Minehead hobby horse was different in design from that of Padstow, it was "no less impressive". In 1978, Cawte noted that the Minehead custom had "never been so fashionable" as its Padstow counterpart, and that as such it had received less research from folklorists and historians. He also reported that among Minehead locals there was a claim that the Padstow hobby horse had been created by Cornish sailors after they had observed that at Minehead.

24 miles west of Minehead, in the North Devon coastal town of Combe Martin, a hobby horse custom was recorded as existing in the early nineteenth century but had apparently died out by 1837. In this custom, a procession traversed the town on Ascension Day; it included not only the Hobby Horse but also individuals dressed as grenadiers, a character identified as the fool and another as "the Earl of Rone", as well as a real donkey. In the 1970s, Cawte reported that Minehead locals claimed that there had once been a rivalry between their hobby horse and that at Combe Martin, although he added that there was no corroborating evidence for the accuracy of such a claim.
