= Old Horse =

Folk custom in north-eastern England

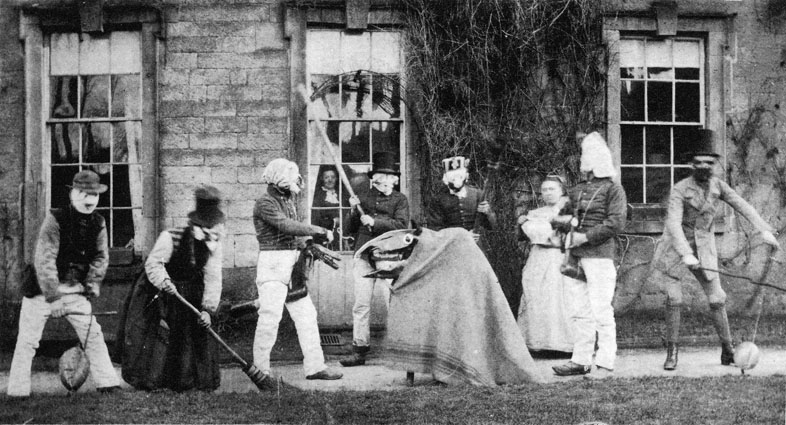
The three Winster hobby horses and other performers, c. 1870

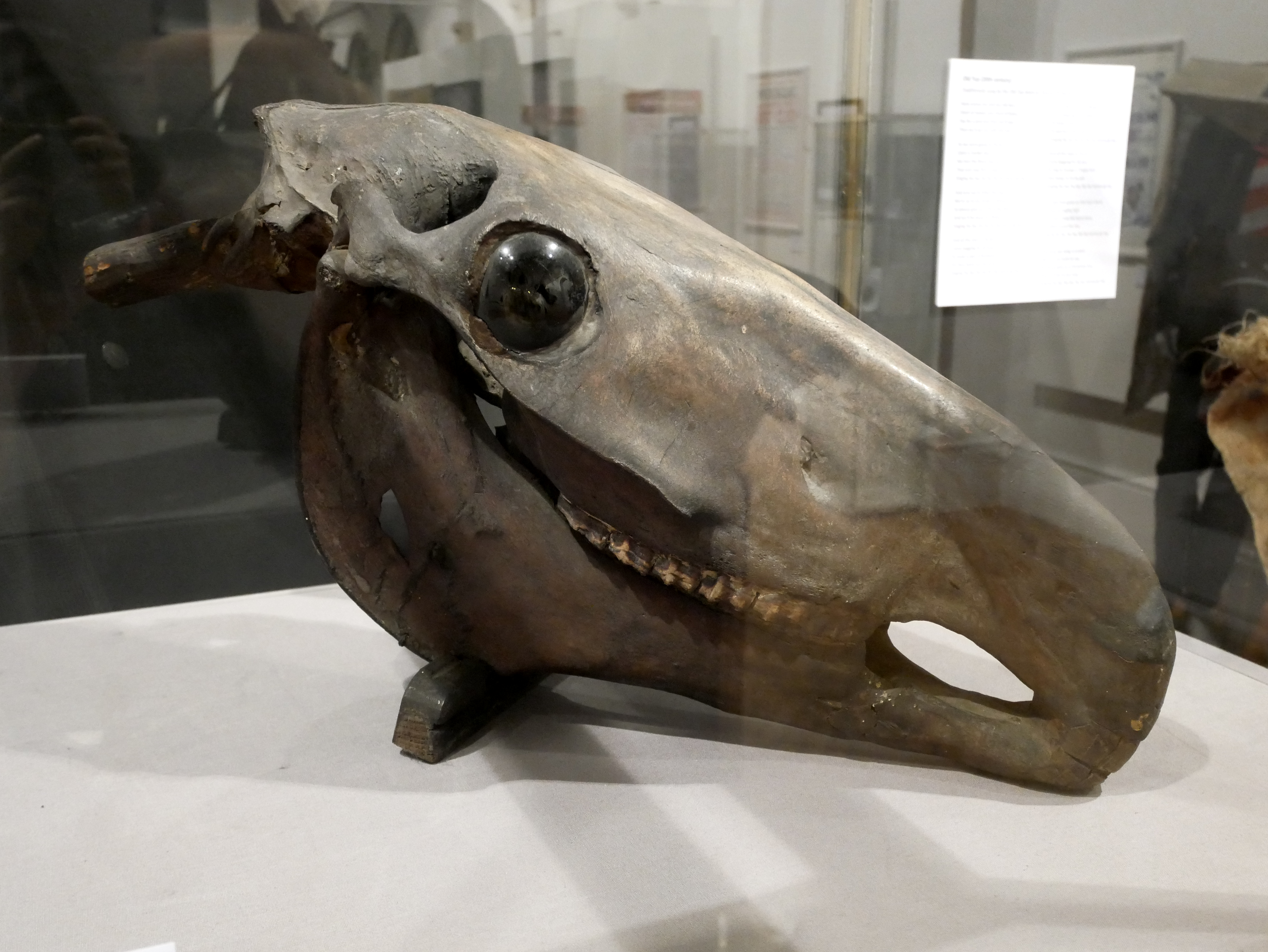
Old Horse head that mummers threw into a pond at Hooton Pagnell Hall in the 1880s

Old Horse was a folk custom found in an area of north-eastern England. Geographically, the custom was found in Nottinghamshire, Derbyshire, and part of Yorkshire. The tradition entails the use of a hobby horse that is mounted on a pole and carried by an individual hidden under a sackcloth. It represents a regional variation of a "hooded animal" tradition that appears in various forms throughout the British Isles.

In geographical location and style it displays strong similarities with the Old Tup custom, but in the latter the hobby horse was presented as a goat rather than a horse. The Old Tup was largely found in the same area of England. In Derbyshire, the two customs are often recorded as existing in the same village. Old Horse was less common in Yorkshire than Old Tup, and also spread further into Nottinghamshire than the Old Tup custom did.
