= Christina Hole =

English folklorist and author

- Born: 1896; Rickmansworth
- Died: 1985 (aged 88–89)
- Occupations: Folklorist; writer
- Years active: 1941-1979
- Known for: Collecting folklore

Christina Hole (1896 – 24 November 1985) was an award-winning British folklorist and author, who was described as “for many years the leading authority on English folk customs and culture”.

== Early life and education ==
Hole was born in Rickmansworth in 1896 and brought up in Kingston-on-Thames by her grandmother. She was educated at St Bernard's Convent in Slough before finishing her education in France.

Before the Second World War she worked in Cheshire as an organizer for the Conservative Party. During the Second World War she was, for some time, Oxfordshire Women's Land Army County Secretary.

== Author ==
It was during her pre-war activities in Cheshire that Hole started to collect folklore seriously, activities that led to her first dedicated folklore book, Traditions and Customs of Cheshire (1937).

Hole's many books were aimed at a popular audience and have been described as being “characterised by their gentle lucidity and common sense”. She wrote introductory works on ghosts and witchcraft but is best known for her works on traditional British folk custom; which have been praised for focusing on how customs are performed in the present day, rather than speculating on their "remote origins and lost meanings".

As well as being an author, Hole also acted as an editor of folklore books. For example, in the early 1960s, she acted as joint-editor of European Folktales, published in Copenhagen in 1963 for the Council of Europe.

== Folklore Society ==
Hole joined the Folklore Society in 1941. In 1956 she became a member of the Folklore Society's Council. Prior to this, Hole had organised the Society for Oxfordshire and District Folklore with Prof E. O. James, then editor of the Folklore Society's journal Folk-lore. On James's retirement as editor, Hole took on the role, a position she held until 1979. Under her editorship, the journal "improved in quality and size", in no small part due to Hole's labours (even with Hole refusing to have a telephone installed in her Oxford home).

== Recognition ==
On her retirement from her editorship of Folklore, Hole was awarded the Folklore Society's Coote-Lake Medal for "outstanding research and scholarship" in the field of Folklore Studies.

In an appreciation by Katharine Briggs, Hole was described as being "one of the last of the nineteenth-century cultured ladies...who never went to College", but nevertheless were renowned for their expertise and knowledge in their particular fields.

== Selected publications ==
- Hole, Christina (1934). Wonder Tales of the British Empire. Manchester: Sherratt & Hughes. OCLC 81708562.
- Hole, Christina (1936). Folk-tales of Many Nations. Place of publication not identified: publisher not identified. OCLC 499828872.
- Hole, Christina (1937). Traditions and Customs of Cheshire,. London: Williams and Norgate. OCLC 5073279.
- Hole, Christina (1940). Haunted England: A Survey of English Ghost-lore. London: B.T. Batsford. OCLC 3747243.
- Hole, Christina (1941). English Custom and Usage. London: B.T. Batsford Ltd. OCLC 807134324.
- Hole, Christina (1943). English Folk-Heroes London; New York; Toronto; Sydney: B.T. Batsford. OCLC 493297286.
- Hole, Christina; Peake, Mervyn (illustrator) (1945). Witchcraft in England. London: Batsford. OCLC 603904133.
- Hole, Christina (1947). English Home-life: 1500-1800: Illustrated from Portraits, Paintings and Prints. London; Toronto; New York; Sydney: B. T. Batsford Ltd. OCLC 1192546672.
- Hole, Christina (1949). English Sports and Pastimes. London: B. T. Batsford. OCLC 836741026.
- Hole, Christina (1951). The English Housewife in the Seventeenth century. OCLC 933166209.
- Hole, Christina (1954). English Shrines and Sanctuaries. London: Batsford. OCLC 903226677.
- Hole, Christina (1957). A Mirror of Witchcraft. London. OCLC 902274982.
- Hole, Christina (1961). Easter and its Customs: A Brief Study. London: Richard Bell. OCLC 751083407.
- Radford, Edwin; Radford, Mona Augusta; Hole, Christina (eds.) (1961). Encyclopedia of Superstitions. London: Hutchinson. OCLC 900782313.
- Bodker, Laurits; d'Aronco, Gianfranco; Hole, Christina (eds.) (1963). European Folk Tales. Copenhagen: Rosenkilde and Bagger. OCLC 1131152171.
- Hole, Christina (1965). Saints in Folklore. London: G. Bell & Sons. OCLC 816733384.
- Hole, Christina (1975). English Traditional Customs. London: Batsford. ISBN 978-0-7134-3038-7. OCLC 2029693.
- Hole, Christina (1976). British Folk Customs. London: Hutchinson. ISBN 978-0-09-127340-8. OCLC 924990284.
