= Sackcloth =

Coarse fabric significant to Christianity

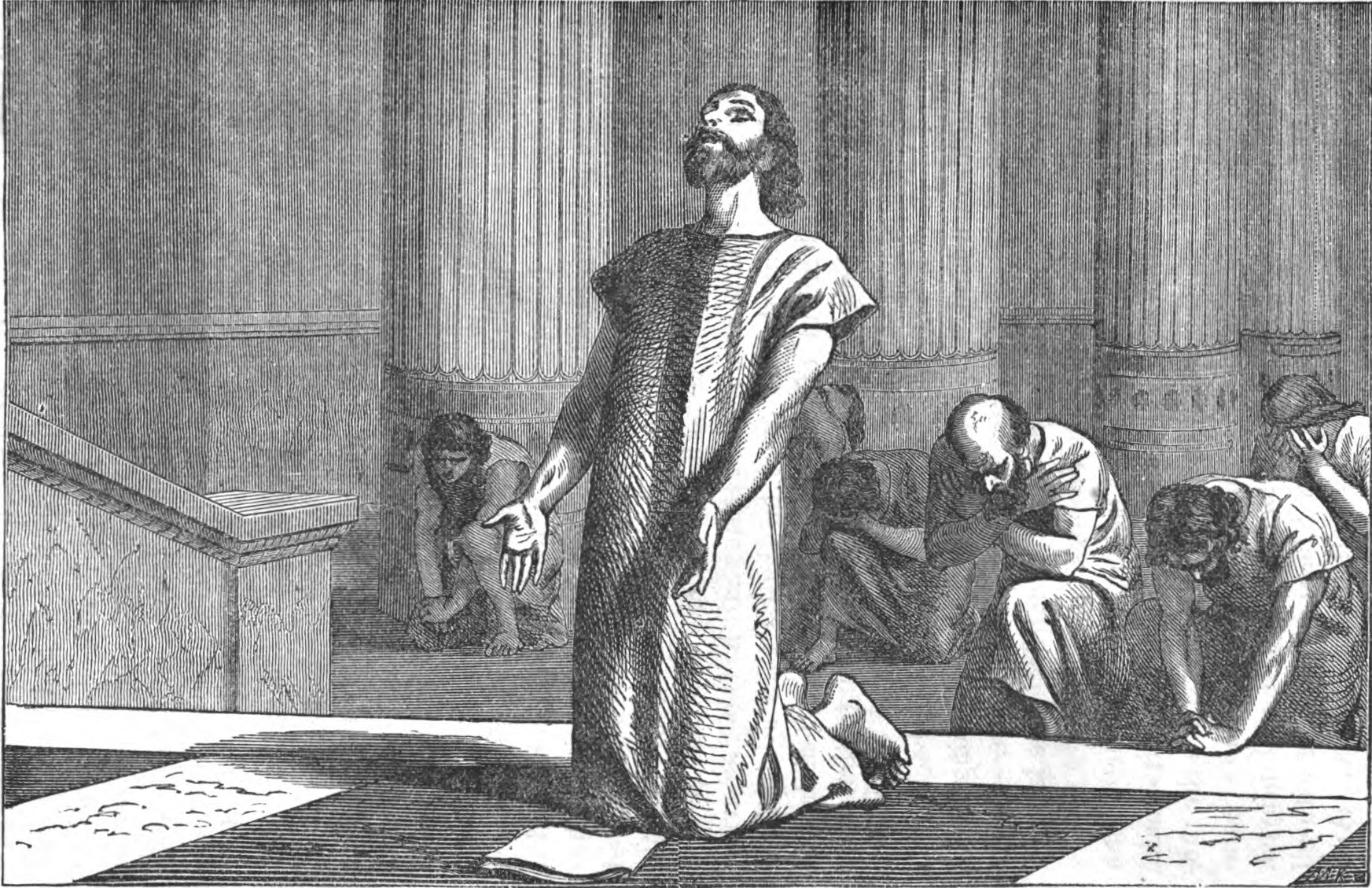
Hezekiah, clothed in śaq, spreads open the letter before the Lord. (2 Kings 19)

Sackcloth (Hebrew: שַׂק śaq) is a coarsely woven fabric, usually made of goat's hair. The term in English often connotes the biblical usage, where the Hastings' Dictionary of the Bible remarks that haircloth would be a more appropriate rendering of the Hebrew meaning.

In some Christian traditions (notably Catholicism), the wearing of hairshirts continues as a self-imposed means of mortifying the flesh that is often practiced during the Christian penitential season of Lent, especially on Ash Wednesday, Good Friday, and other Fridays of the Lenten season.

== As fabric ==
Hessian sackcloth is not the intended biblical meaning, according to a number of scholarly sources, but the identification represents a common misconception based on phonetic association: "Sackcloth, usually made of black goat hair, was used by the Israelites and their neighbors in times of mourning or social protest." Burlap, another term used in English translation, is also generally understood as goat haircloth. Stiff camel hair was also used.

== As garment ==
Sackcloth also came to mean a garment made from such cloth, which was worn as a token of mourning by the Israelites: Jacob clothed his loins with sackcloth on hearing news of the apparent death of his son Joseph. It was also a sign of submission, and of grief and self-humiliation (2 Kings 19:1), and was occasionally worn by the biblical prophets, for example by Isaiah. It is often associated with ashes.

The 1906 Jewish Encyclopedia says that the Old Testament gives no exact description of the garment. According to Adolf Kamphausen, the sacḳ was like a corn-bag with an opening for the head, and another for each arm, an opening being made in the garment from top to bottom. Karl Grüneisen thought it resembled a hairy mantle used by the Bedouins. Friedrich Schwally concluded otherwise that it originally was simply the loin-cloth. Schwally based his opinion on the fact that the word "ḥagar" חָגַר (to gird) is used in describing the putting on of the garment (see Joshua 1:8; Isaiah 3:24, 15:8, 22:12; Jeremiah 6:26, 49:3). One fastens it around the hips ("sim be-motnayim", Genesis 37:34; "he'elah 'al motnayim", Amos 8:10), while, in describing the removal of sacḳcloth, the words "pitteaḥ me-'al motnayim" are used in Isaiah 20:2. According to 1 Kings 21:27 and 2 Kings 6:30, it was worn next to the skin.

In later times it came to be worn for religious purposes only, on extraordinary occasions, or at mourning ceremonies. Isaiah wore nothing else, and was commanded by God to don it (Isaiah 20:2). The Jewish Encyclopedia suggests that "old traditions about to die out easily assume a holy character".

In Islamic usage, Schwally points to the circumstance that the Muslim pilgrim, as soon as he puts his foot on Ḥaram, the holy soil, takes off all the clothes he is wearing, and dons the iḥram.

== See also ==
- Repentance (Christianity)
- Cilice
- Penance
- Mortification of the flesh
- Flagellant
- Hessian fabric
- Felt

== Attibution ==
Much of this article is taken from the article Sackcloth by Joseph Jacobs and Wilhelm Nowack in the 1906 Jewish Encyclopedia, now in the public domain in the United States as a work published before 1923.
