= The Peasant's Wise Daughter =

German fairy tale

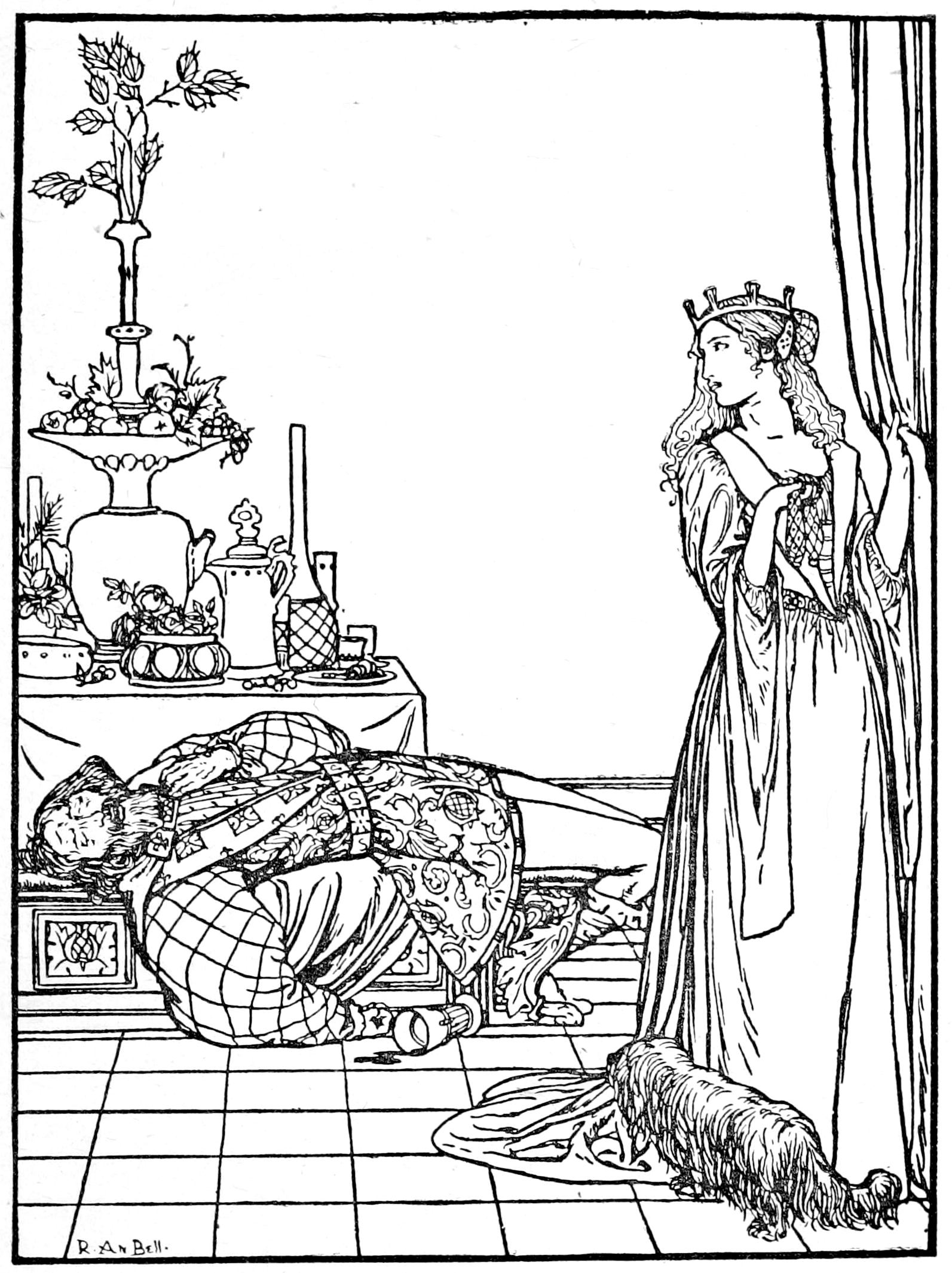
- The once peasant queen drugs her husband, the king. Illustration from Grimm's Household Tales (1912), by R. Anning Bell.

Folk tale
- Name: The Peasant's Wise Daughter
- Also known as: Die kluge Bauerntochter; The Peasant's Clever Daughter; The Clever Lass (Joseph Jacobs)
- Aarne–Thompson grouping: ATU 875 (The Clever Farmgirl)
- Region: Germany, Eurasia,
- Published in: Kinder- und Hausmärchen by the Brothers Grimm

"The Peasant's Wise Daughter", "The Peasant's Clever Daughter" or "The Clever Lass" is a German fairy tale collected by the Brothers Grimm in Grimm's Fairy Tales as tale number 94. It has also spread into Bohemia and Božena Němcová included it into her collection of Czech national folk tales in 1846.

It is Aarne-Thompson type 875 ("The Clever Farmgirl"). This type of tale is the commonest European tale dealing with witty exchanges.

== Origin ==
The Brothers Grimm published this tale in the second volume of the first edition of Kinder- und Hausmärchen in 1815. Their informant was Dorothea Viehmann.

== Synopsis ==
A peasant begged some land from the king. When he and his daughter dug the field, they found a mortar made of gold. The daughter warned that if they gave it to the king for his kindness, he would ask for the pestle as well; the father gave it nonetheless, and the king asked for the pestle and put him in prison until he got it. The peasant lamented his folly in not listening to his daughter. The king had him brought before him again, and asked what he meant. The peasant explained.

The king summoned the daughter and set her riddle: to come to him neither naked nor clothed, neither walking nor riding, neither on the road nor off it. If she guessed it, she had proved her cleverness and would marry him. She wrapped herself in fish net, and tied it to a donkey's tail so that it had to drag her along, and she kept only one toe touching the ground. The king agreed that she had guessed the riddle; he freed her father and married her.

Some years later, a mare gave birth to a foal that ran off and lay down under an ox. Both the peasant who owned the mare and the one who owned the ox claimed it; the king said it belonged where it was found. The peasant who owned the mare went to the queen for help. She told him to take a fishing net and pretend to fish on dry land where the king would see; when the king said it was impossible, he was to say it was no more impossible than oxen giving birth to foals. The peasant did so, and the king gave him the foal but got from him that the queen had given him the advice. He sent the queen back to her father, saying she could take only one thing, what she valued most, from the castle. The queen gave him a sleeping draught and took him back to her father's house. When he woke, she told him that he was what she valued most in the castle; he took her back with him to the castle and once again recognized her as his wife.

== Motifs and variants ==
=== Antiquity and distribution ===
Joseph Jacobs points out in Europa's Fairy Book that the tale has many parallels across both Europe and Asia.

Ulrich Marzolph and Richard van Leewen comment that the motif of the clever maiden who answers the prince's riddles is ancient enough to be present in the Mahabharata and in narratives of the Jatakas.

The story of a poor maiden's cleverness can be found in Norse mythology and Viking legend of Aslaug and Ragnar Lodbrok, specially the riddle of coming "not dressed, yet not undressed".

Folklorist Stith Thompson argued for a Central European source for the ATU 875 type.

=== Continental variants ===
Scholars Johannes Bolte and Jiří Polívka listed several variants from across the globe in their seminal work on the Brothers Grimm fairy tale collection.

==== Italy ====
Variants have been registered in Italian scholarship, as noted by Jack Zipes; for instance, by Laura Gonzenbach. A version from Abruzzi (The Clever Girl) begins with an old lady blessing the newborn peasant girl with "beauty and wit", but otherwise remains a realistic tale.

A scholarly inquiry by Italian Istituto centrale per i beni sonori ed audiovisivi ("Central Institute of Sound and Audiovisual Heritage"), produced in the late 1960s and early 1970s, found thirty variants of the tale across Italian sources.

==== Spain ====
In a variant from Mallorca, Das Märchen des Bockes (Sa Rondaya des Boch), the king inquires the girl's parents about the maiden's cleverness.

==== Ireland ====
Irish folklorist Patrick Kennedy listed The Poor Girl that became a Queen as another variant.

==== Scotland ====
A Scottish variant titled Diarmaid and Grainne was collected by Joseph Campbell in Popular Tales of the West Highlands.

==== Eastern Europe ====
Professor Andrejev noted that the tale type 875, "The Clever Peasant Girl", was one of "the most populär" of the Novella or Realistic Tales "in the Ukrainian repertoire", with 20 variants, in contrast to 11 variants from Russia (but still considered to be "among the most widespread [novella] types" in Russia).

A Serbian variant is attested (The Maiden who was Wiser than the King), but it differs from the usual plot: instead of the golden mortar and the dispute about the foal, the peasant girl and the king try to outsmart each other with counter-riddles.

A Russian variant ("The Sage Damsel") subverts the traditional ending: the wise and humble maiden helps a peasant simpleton with a good heart, and chooses him over the king.

In another Slavic variant, "Clever Manka: The Story of a Girl Who Knew What to Say", at the end of the tale, the burgomaster begins to consult with his clever wife for the problems that are brought to him.

French author Edouard Laboulaye translated a Croatian variant titled A Female Solomon in his book Last Fairy Tales.

Slovenian variants of the tale type attest the presence of the legendary King Matjaž (King Matthias), of Slovenian folklore.

==== Lithuania ====
Folklorist Jonas Balys (lt), in his 1936 publication on Lithuanian folktales, reported 41 variants of tale type Gudri ūkininko duktė. A later analysis by professor Bronislava Kerbelytė registered 165 variants, under the banner The Clever Farmgirl, with and without contamination from other tale types.

==== Scandinavia ====
A Swedish variant was collected by August Bondeson, from Södermanland, with the title Den kloka torparedottern.

==== Middle East ====
Ulrich Marzolph and Richard van Leewven list The Chick-pea Seller's Daughter, from The Arabian Nights, as a variant of the story.

Inea Bushnaq's Arab Folktales includes a variant, "The Clever Minister's Daughter".

==== Americas ====
Professor Ernest Warren Baughman lists American variants in North Carolina and Kentucky. Variants have also been collected in Mississippi.

=== Other versions ===
The motif of a girl's cleverness used to rebuff the advances of an unwanted magical suitor happens in traditional English and Scottish Child Ballads nr. 1 (Riddles Wisely Expounded) and nr. 2 (The Elfin Knight).

There are variants in which it is a male that defies the king with his cleverness, such as a tale from Saint Martin, collected by anthropologist Elsie Clews Parsons.

== See also ==
- What Is the Fastest Thing in the World?
- The Wise Little Girl
- Die Kluge (Märchenoper by Carl Orff)

== Bibliography ==
- Bolte, Johannes; Polívka, Jiri. Anmerkungen zu den Kinder- u. hausmärchen der brüder Grimm. Zweiter Band (NR. 61-120). Germany, Leipzig: Dieterich'sche Verlagsbuchhandlung. 1913. pp. 349–373.
- Haase, Donald. The Greenwood Encyclopedia of Folktales and Fairy Tales: A-F. Greenwood Publishing Group. 2007. p. 353.
- Haase, Donald. The Greenwood Encyclopedia of Folktales and Fairy Tales: G-P. Greenwood Publishing Group. 2008. p. 732.
- Jacobs, Joseph. European Folk and Fairy Tales. New York, London: G. P. Putnam's sons. 1916. pp. 256-259.
