= Hunt the Wren =

Manx tradition on 26 December

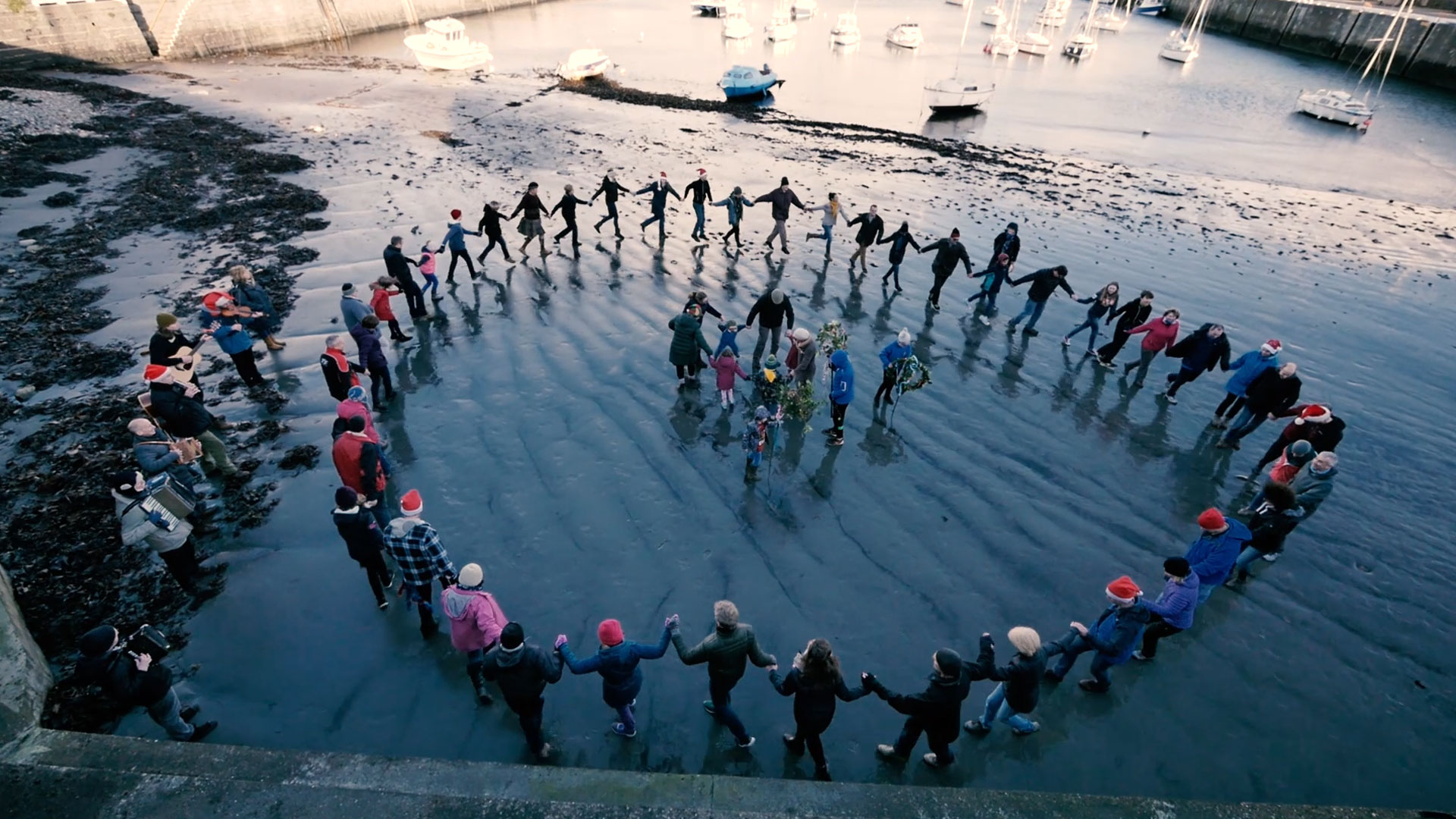
Hunt the Wren on the sand at Port St. Mary, 2016

Hunt the Wren (Manx: Shelg yn Dreean) is a traditional custom carried out on the Isle of Man on 26 December, Saint Stephen's Day. Traditionally, men and boys hunted a wren and placed it on top of a staff decorated with holly, ivy and ribbons, or displayed it in a decorated box on top of a pole. This was paraded around the neighbourhood by a group of 'wren boys'—typically dressed in straw masks, greenery and colourful motley clothing—who sang songs and played music in exchange for donations. The people afterwards held a funeral for the wren and danced around the 'wren pole' or 'wren bush'. The custom has been undergoing revival since the late 20th century, although the wren is no longer hunted and a stuffed wren is used instead. There is a very similar tradition on St Stephen's Day in Ireland, where it is known as Wren Day. It is speculated that the tradition derives from ancient Celtic paganism.

== Origins ==
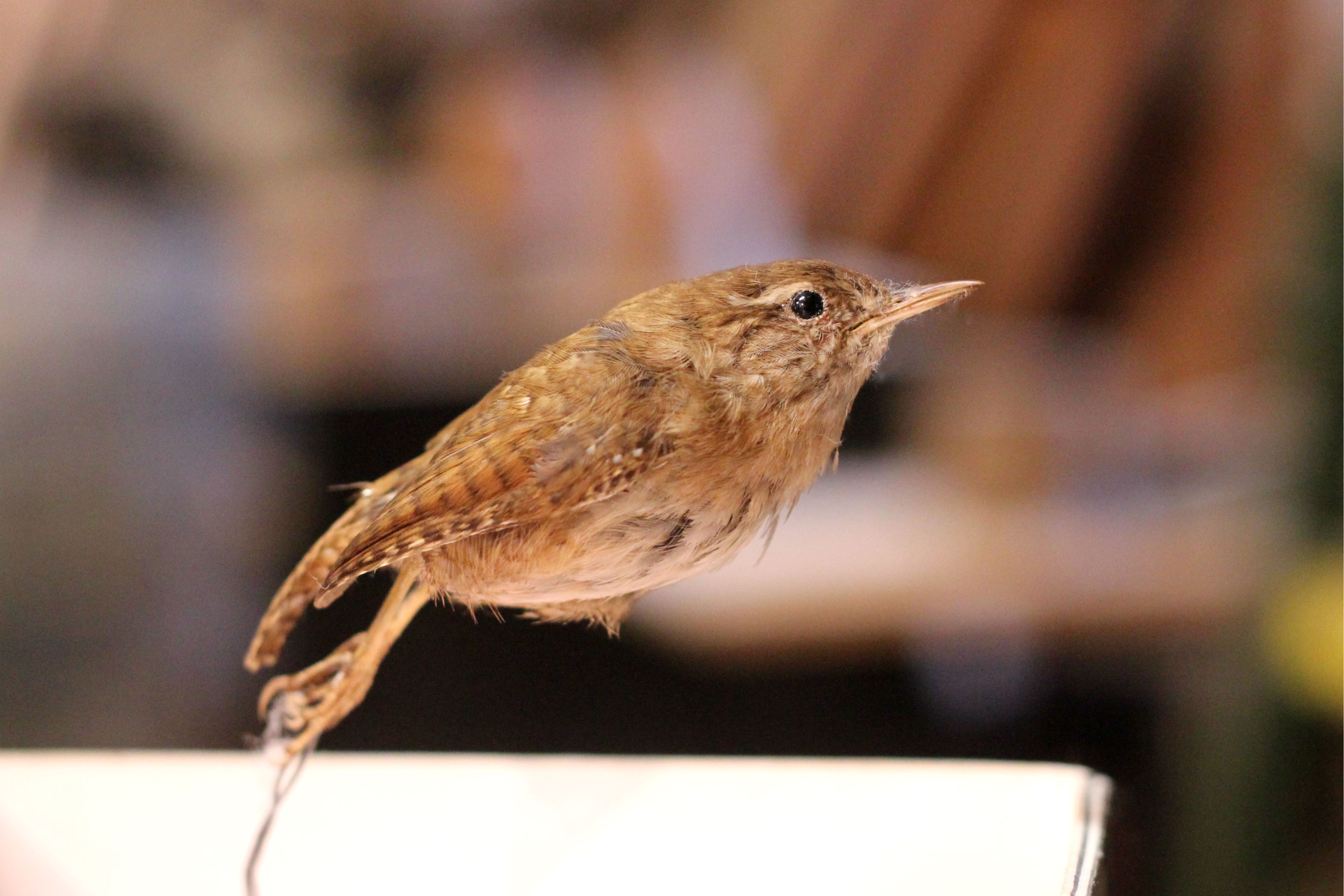
A taxidermy wren used for Hunt the Wren in Douglas

The tradition on the Isle of Man is closely related to similar practices carried out across Europe, particularly Wren Day in Ireland. It has been suggested that the tradition probably originates in sacrificial practices due to the reverence with which the wren is held outside of this one day of the year, and the value given to obtaining one of the bird's feathers. Further justification for this possible root to the custom is sometimes seen in the wren's status as 'The king of all birds,' as it is described in both the Hunt the Wren song and independently in Manx folklore.

The earliest and most common folklore story accounting for the origin of "hunt the wren" tells of a fairy/enchantress/witch whose beauty lures the men of the Isle of Man to harm, for which she is chased and is changed into the form of a wren. It is therefore in punishment for her actions that the wren is hunted on St. Stephen's Day. One version of the tale is as follows:

Many years ago there came to the Island a beautiful woman of the fairy people. She went all through the land, and wherever she appeared she put such enchantment on the men, by her beauty and her wonderful attractive powers, that they one and all left their work and their homes to follow her. When she had them all collected in this way, she led them across an apparently shallow ford in a wide river. She herself went across almost dryshod, but when her followers attempted the fording, the river rose in fury and drowned nearly all of them. Upon this the survivors, brought to their senses by the disaster, gave chase to the woman, seeking vengeance upon her; but she, laughing in mockery, changed herself into the shape of a wren and flew away. Some say that this particular wren was the first to be hunted, killed, and carried round for exhibition, others that the actual witch-woman escaped; but it is generally believed to be in memory of this event that the wren is hunted and carried annually.

The name of this enchantress is sometimes given as 'Tehi Tegi', due to the obvious similarity of the tale in Sophia Morrison's Manx Fairy Tales, although no direct reference is made there, or earlier, linking that named figure to the tradition.

Other folklore accounts of the origins of the custom suggest that the wren is the assumed form taken by a sea spirit which formerly attacked the herring fleet, or that the wren inadvertently awoke the slumbering enemy when pecking at some crumbs on a drum.

== History ==
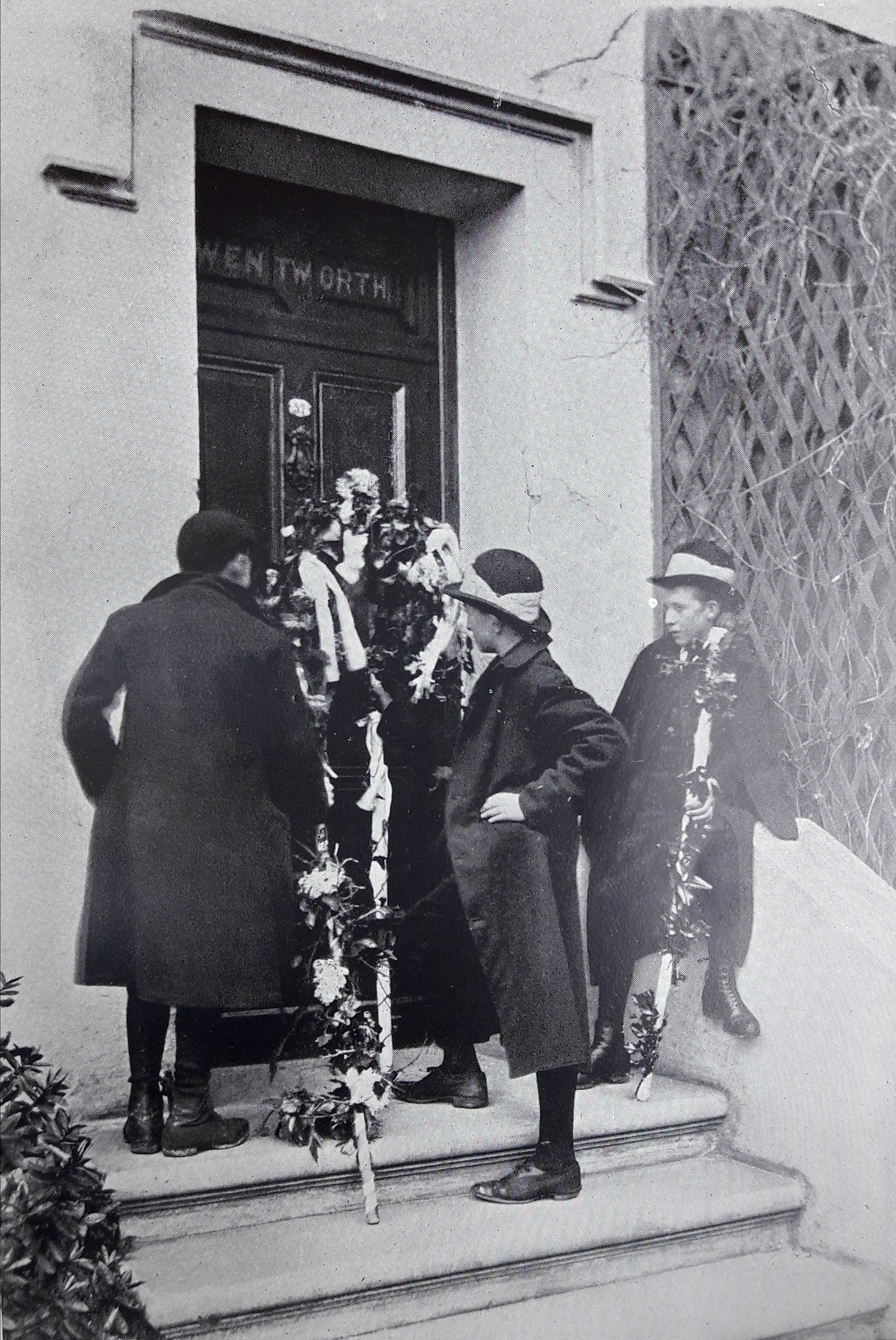
Hunt the Wren in Ramsey (Waterloo Road), 1904

The practice of Hunt the Wren was first noted in the 1720s, when it was remarked as having been practised since 'time immemorial.'

The wren was reputedly hunted after midnight on 24 / 25 December as a part of the Christmas festivities. The caught bird was laid on a bier and buried in the local churchyard with ‘a whimsical kind of solemnity’ including the singing of dirges in Manx. A much later account relates that the Manx words spoken at the burial of the wren were: Shee er yn dreean, shee er yn cheer, shee er y cheeyl, as shee er meehene ('Peace on the Wren, peace on the country, peace on the church, and peace on myself').

A report of 1816 notes the hunting of the wren taking place between sunrise and sunset, and that the bird on that day was 'pursued, pelted, fired at, and destroyed, without mercy.' By at least this date the feathers of the bird were considered to bring good luck for the coming year, particularly against shipwreck. It was even noted that 'a fisherman would be considered as extremely foolhardy, who should enter upon his occupation without such a safeguard.'

By 1845 it was said that 'for a century past' the practice was done on St Stephen's Day. Dancing is here mentioned for the first time, was something which happened after the bird was buried in the churchyard: 'After the obsequies were performed, the company, outside the church-yard wall, formed a circle and danced to music which they had provided for the occasion.' However, it was also noted that the burial of the bird in churchyards had 'long since been abandoned,' with the bird instead being buried at the sea shore or some other such wasteland.

In the 1840s the practice was spoken of as being popular mainly amongst boys, with as many as four different groups parading their wren around Douglas in 1842 (with each group blowing a horn). They are spoken of as going:

from door to door with a wren, suspended by the legs, in the centre of two hoops, crossing each other at right angles, decorated with evergreens and ribbons, singing lines called "Hunt the Wren."

The activity was popular in the 1880s, with about 30 sets of 'Hunt the Wren Boys' going around Douglas alone in 1884. Of these 30 groups, it was reported that only one had an actual wren on their pole; the others substituting 'a game-cock, rook, or, strange to say, a monster rat, for the wren.' By the 1890s the practice of capturing a wren was seen as rare and instead just the wren pole was being taken around the houses with singing. By the 1900s the practice remained common, with numbers of separate groups going around to Hunt the Wren in Onchan, Castletown, Douglas, Peel, Port St. Mary and Kirk Michael, and one group going to Hunt the Wren in Ramsey. Despite reports of it as 'dying out' in the 1930s, the practice of singing around the houses with the wren pole was still taking place in 1975, though it was said to be only 'done by children in Peel and occasionally in other places.' However, with the Manx cultural revival of the 1970s the dance was reintroduced into the practice, and it is in this form that the custom has become re-established since. Today the tradition is now flourishing with Hunt the Wren taking place in a number of towns and villages across the Isle of Man.

== Song ==
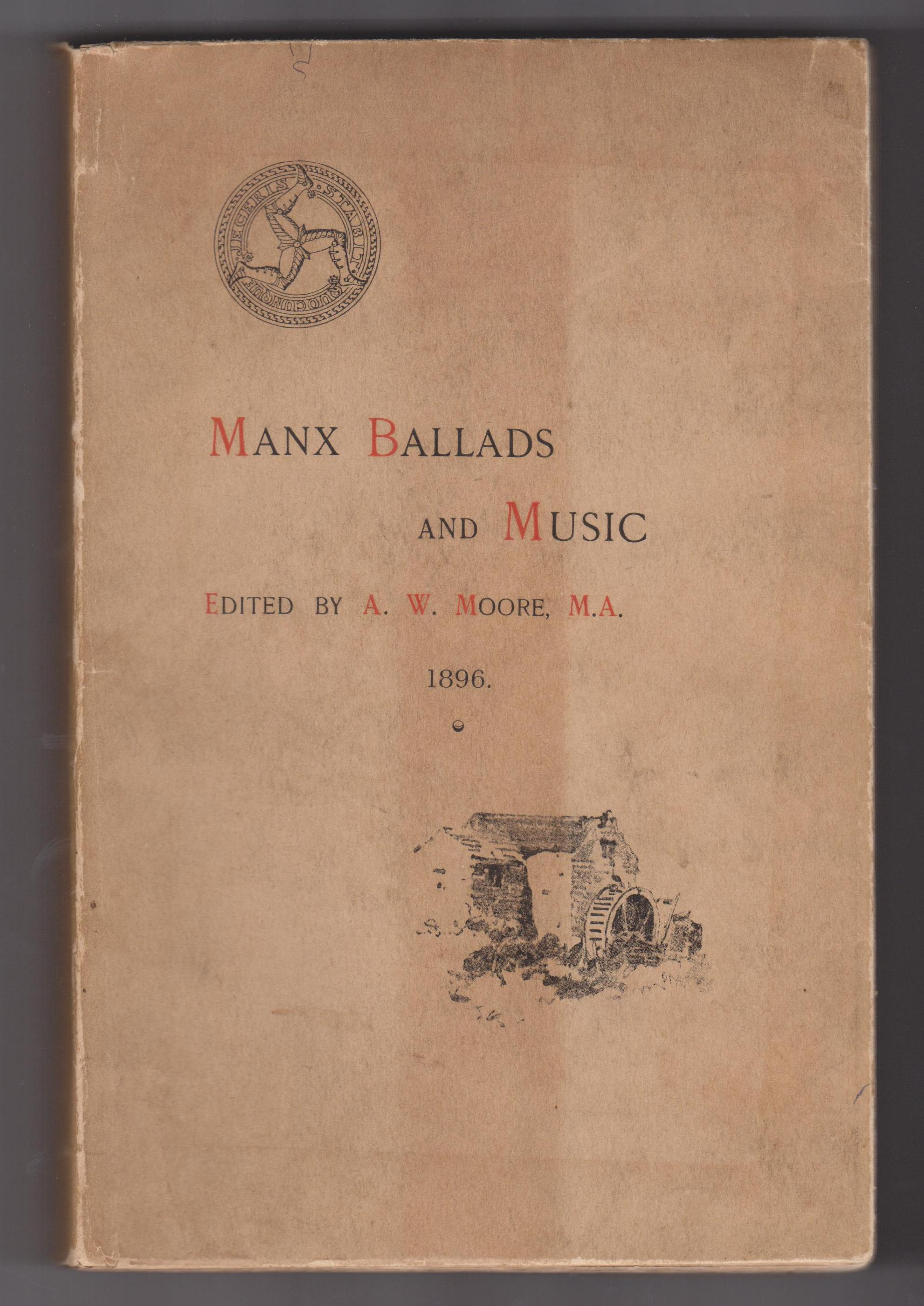
Manx Ballads and Music (1896) which features one of the key standard versions of the Hunt the Wren song

=== History and lyrics ===
The earliest references to the tradition speak of Manx 'dirges’ being sung at the burial of the wren, however, any such songs have now been lost. The song known today as 'Hunt the Wren’ is associated with the practice of singing with the wren at people's doors in the hope of receiving money.

The melody was first printed in 1820, and the words appeared in print in 1845, with 'Jackey the Land' featuring instead of today's 'Jack o' the Land'. An alternative version was collected in 1843, which featured the closing paragraph for the first time. It was noted at this time that a number of versions of the song existed and that this was just one example of its variations.

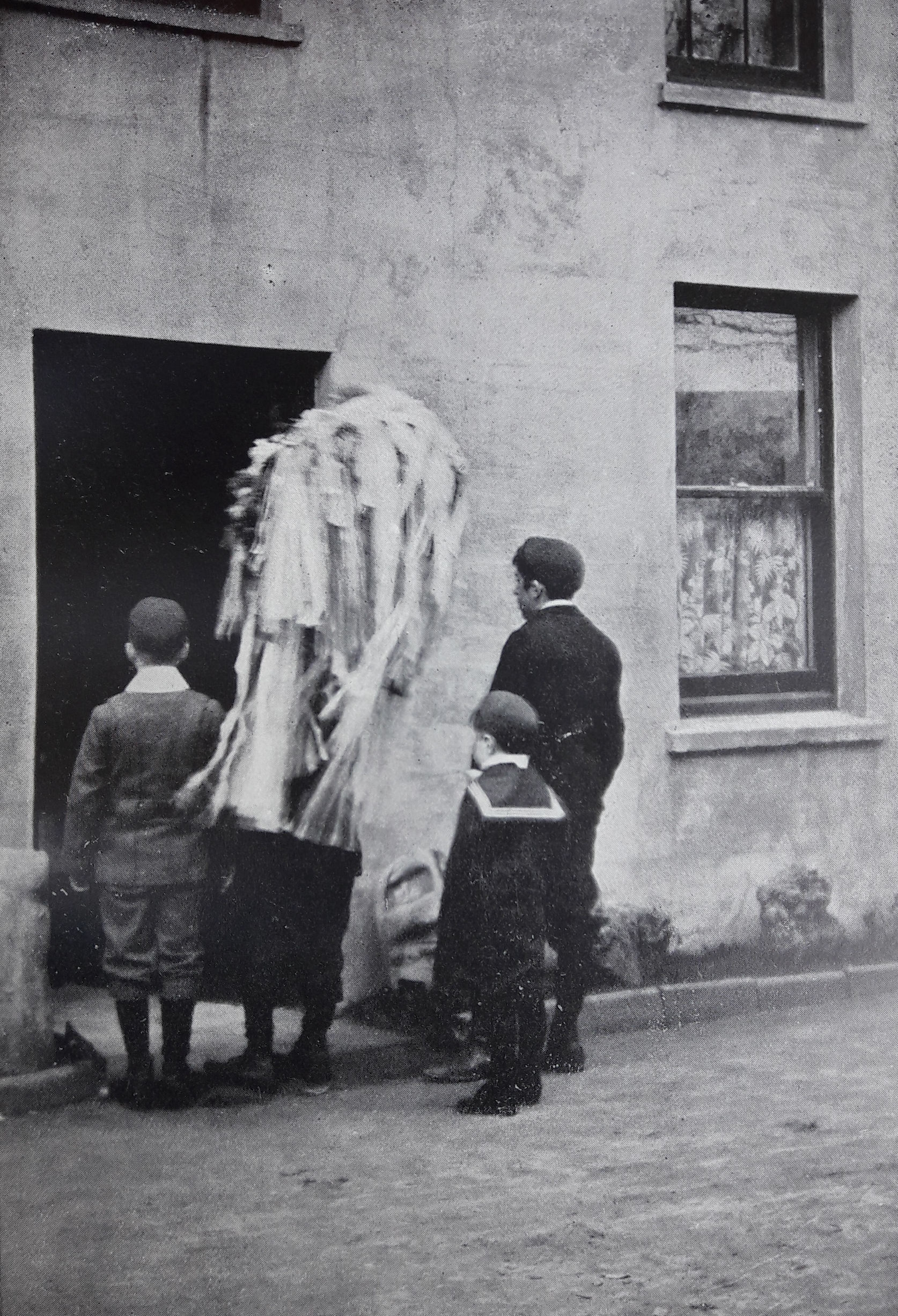
Hunt the Wren in Douglas, 1904. It would have been groups of boys like this that sang the song in this period.

The first appearance of the Manx version appeared in A. W. Moore's Manx Ballads and Music of 1896, created from a combination of oral collection and 're'-translation from the English. It was here noted of the earlier 1843 version of the song that 'from its form is clearly itself a literal translation of the Manx.' It is this version, along with elements of A. W. Moore's earlier printed version, which today forms the basis for the standard set of words to sing. The song begins:

Helg yn Dreain / Hunt the Wren
Hemmayd gys y keyll, dooyrt Robbin y Vobbin, Hemmayd gys y keyll, dooyrt Richard y Robin, Hemmayd gys y keyll, dooyrt Juan y Thalloo, Hemmayd gys y keyll, dooyrt ooilley unnane.	We'll away to the woods, says Robin the Bobbin, We'll away to the woods, says Richard the Robbin; We'll away to the woods, says jack of the Land. We'll away to the woods, says every one.

The song continues in this form with the following development:

What shall we do there? / We'll hunt the wren. / Where is he? where is he? / In yonder green bush. / I see him, I see him. / How shall we get him down? / With sticks and stones. / He's dead, he's dead. / How'll we get him home? / We'll hire a cart. / Whose cart shall we hire? / Johnny Bill Fell's. / Who will stand driver? / Filley the Tweet. / He's home, he's home. / How shall we get him boiled? / In the brewery pan. / Who'll dine at dinner? / The king and the queen. / How shall we get him eaten? / With knives and forks. / He is eat, he is eat. / The eyes for the blind. / The legs for the lame. / The pluck for the poor. / The bones for the dogs.

The song concludes with the final verse:

The wren, the wren, the king of all birds,
We've caught, St. Stephen's Day, in the furze;
Although he is little, his family is great,
I pray you, good dame, do give us a treat.

In 1896 it was noted that the song was rarely performed in this form at that time, as it was more often heard 'in a very corrupt and degenerate form.' The fuller version of the song was reinstated in the 1970s.

=== Field recordings ===
Joe and Winifred Woods of Douglas sang a version of the song learnt in their childhood to Peter Kennedy in 1965, which can be heard on the British Library Sound Archive website.

The song has also been recorded numerous times from traditional singers in England; versions are available on the British Library Sound Archive from Newcastle, Hull, Oxfordshire and Lancashire.

A fragment of a variant recorded in Missouri, USA is available online via the Max Hunter collection.

== Dance ==
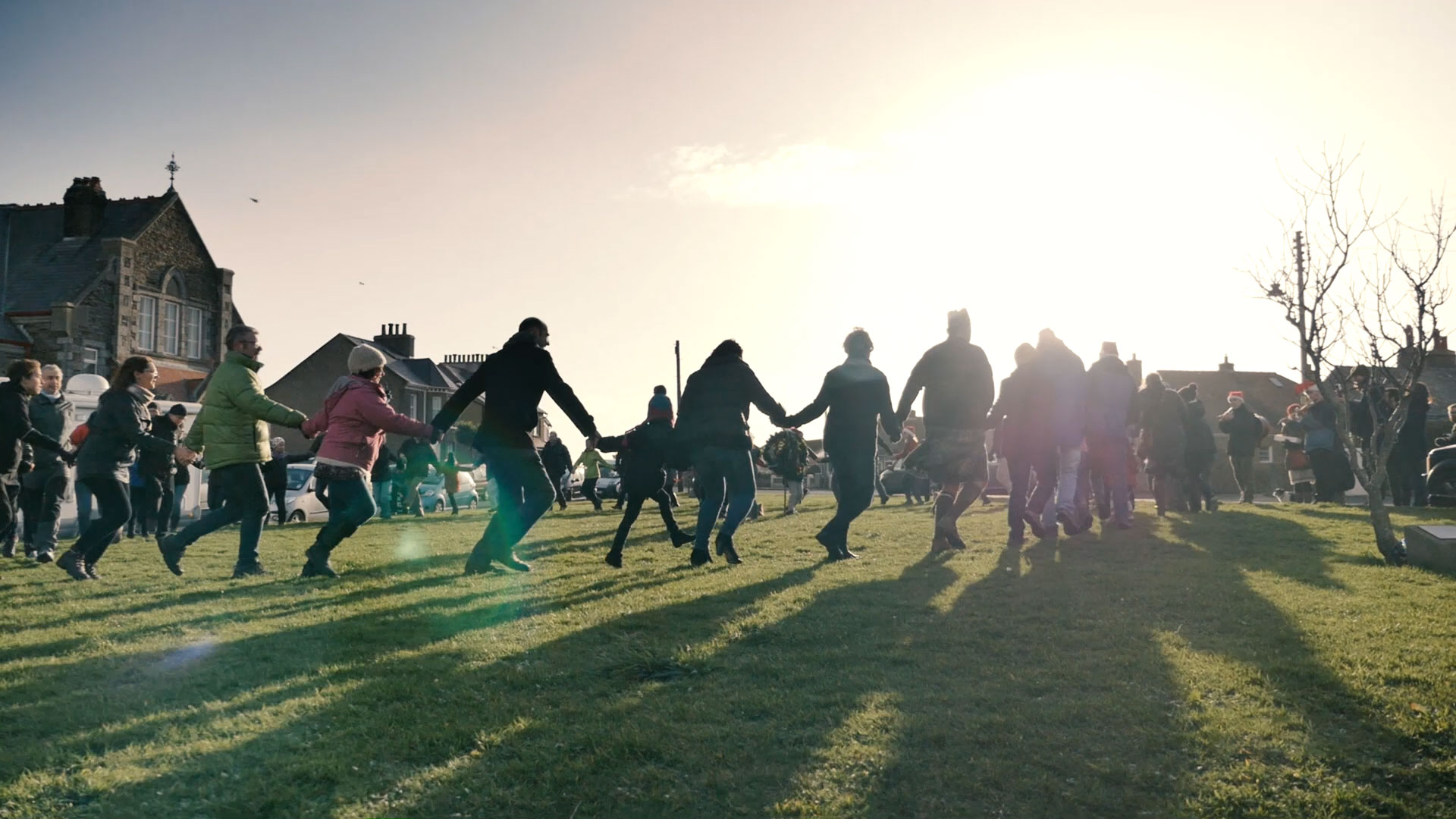
Hunt the Wren dancing at Port St. Mary, 2016

Dancing was first mentioned as a part of the tradition in 1845, when it was said that people 'formed a circle and danced to music’ outside the churchyard after the wren had been buried. Any dance associated with Hunt the Wren was assumed to have been lost until a dance was discovered preserved as a children's game in Lezayre in 1925 by Mona Douglas.

The children's game was for four couples and one additional girl. The game consisted of this extra girl trying to steal another's partner, until the one finally left without a partner had to spin round and round with the wren pole (which was referred to as 'the Bush’).

It is believed that originally this dance was performed by men only. However, one half of the men had their faces blackened and the other half were dressed in women's clothing. The additional 'woman' was known as the 'Ben-treoghe the Dreean' (Widow of the Wren), who 'wandered in and out of the dance' before finally spinning around with the wren pole.

The dance was first published in 1953, but its best known recorded form today is in the widely accessible Rinkaghyn Vannin, where it is titled, 'Helg yn Dreean'. The dance consists of any number of couples dancing in a ring, first clockwise and then anticlockwise, followed by first the women and then the men dancing in to 'honour’ the bush, after which the couples reel spin before changing partners and starting again.

Today the dance is normally performed with dancers shaking their first at the wren in place of 'honouring' it. On St. Stephen's Day the dance is always performed with a wren pole in the centre, normally held by a younger child. The wren pole is sometimes omitted in more formal displays where it the dance performed alongside others. Also, where there are large volumes of people and a restricted space, two rings of dancers can be adopted, normally with younger dancers in the inner ring.

== Practice today ==
The Hunt the Wren tradition is flourishing today on the Isle of Man, with as many as 80 people attending the event at Port St. Mary alone. It also takes place in Douglas, St. John's, Ramsey, Kirk Michael, Ballaugh and Sulby. Many of the groups are underpinned by Manx dance groups, such as Perree Bane in Port St. Mary and the Manx Folk Dance Society in Douglas. The dancers today collect for charities, such as the Island's Lifeboats. The dance is performed on St. Stephen's Day to a vocal or instrumental backing, and frequently with both. Although no feathers are available (as actual wrens are not used today), ribbons are instead taken from the wren pole for good luck.

The dance is also popular as a part of the traditional Manx dance repertoire and it can frequently be seen performed at events such as Tynwald Day. The tune remains within the current Manx music repertoire, and it continues to appear in sets and in new interpretations.
