= Cutty Wren =

Traditional English folk song

Song
- Published: 1776
- Genre: English folk song
- Songwriter: Unknown

"The Cutty Wren" and its variants such as "The Hunting of the Wren" are traditional English folk songs. The origins and meaning of the song are disputed. It is number 236 in the Roud Folk Song Index.

== Origin ==
The song is thought by some to represent the human sacrifice of the Year King, or the symbolic substitute slaughter of the wren as "king of the birds" at the end of the year for similar purposes, and such songs are traditionally sung on Boxing Day (26 December), just after the winter solstice. 26 December is sometimes called Saint Stephen's Day or Wren Day. These rituals are discussed in The Golden Bough.

It is alternatively attributed to the English Peasants' Revolt of 1381, and the wren is supposed to be the young king Richard II, who is killed and fed to the poor. However, there is no strong evidence to connect this song with the Peasants' Revolt. The idea seems to have originated in A.L. Lloyd's 1944 book The Singing Englishman. The liner notes to Chumbawamba's album English Rebel Songs 1381–1914 state categorically that the song was written in the fourteenth century. However, the earliest known text is from Herd's "Scots Songs" of 1776. The song is given no title, but begins with these words:

Will ze go to the wood? quo' FOZIE MOZIE;
Will ze go to the wood? quo' JOHNIE REDNOZIE;
Will ze go to the wood? quo' FOSLIN'ene;
Will ze go to the wood? quo' brither and kin.

What to do there? quo' FOZIE MOZIE;
What to do there? quo' JOHNIE REDNOZIE;
What to do there? quo' FOSLIN'ene;
What to do there? quo' brither and kin.

To slay the WREN, quo' FOZIE MOZIE:
To slay the WREN, quo' JOHNIE REDNOZIE:
To slay the WREN, quo' FOSLIN'ene:
To slay the WREN, quo' brither and kin.

The dialect word "cutty", meaning "small" or "short", is found in Northern England and the Scottish Lowlands, suggesting that versions of the song that use the word come from these regions.

Variants of the song exist across the British Isles. In Orkney a version called "The Brethren Three" (published 1915) describes the song as a lullaby. ("We'll aff tae the wids, says Tosie Mosie"). Aside from the English and Scottish versions, it exists in Welsh (Hela'r Dryw") and Manx ("Helg Yn Dreain").

In the USA the song has undergone considerable evolution into the song "Billy Barlow", first known in 1916.

== The Hunting of the Wren ==
The Hunting of the Wren is thought by many folklorists to be related to the nursery-rhyme Who Killed Cock Robin. On or near the winter solstice people hunted and killed the wren for its supposed misdeed. The custom of killing wrens on 26 December was mostly stamped out in the British Isles by the Society for the Prevention of Cruelty to Animals, according to William S. Walsh in Curiosities of Popular Customs.

In Ireland a hunt for the wren generally took place on Saint Stephen's Day (26 December). In a procession the same night, lads dressed in bizarre costumes made of straw and colourful cloth carried branches from which hung the body of the wren, as they sang:

The wren, the wren, the king of all birds
On St Stephen's Day was caught in the furze
Although he was little, his power is great
So up with the kettle and down with the plate!

On the Isle of Man, up to the end of the eighteenth century, the ceremony (which has parallels in France and Galicia) was observed on Christmas morning.

American versions mention a squirrel, rat or other small animal rather than a wren. The Chieftains' stage performances have included dancers dressed as Wrenboys in straw clothes. This has been captured on the album The Bells of Dublin, which includes six tracks devoted to the ceremony, singing and dancing.

== Traditional recordings ==
The song has also been recorded numerous times from traditional singers in England; versions are available on the British Library Sound Archive from Newcastle, Hull, Oxfordshire and Lancashire.

Joe and Winifred Woods of Douglas, Isle of Man, sang a version of the song learnt in their childhood to Peter Kennedy in 1965, which can be heard on the British Library Sound Archive website.

A few versions were recorded in the United States including one sung by Don Gaetz of Clifton, Arkansas in 1967, which can be heard via the Max Hunter Folk Collection website.

== Popular recordings ==
- 1939: Topic Records TRC7 Side B, Topic Singers, as "Cutty Wren"
- 1953: American Folk Songs for Children, Pete Seeger, as "Billy Barlow"
- 1955: The Lark in the Morning, Liam Clancy, as "The Wran Song"
- 1958: "Texas Folksongs", Alan Lomax, as "Billy Barlow"
- 1962: "Songs of Protest", The Ian Campbell Folk Group, as "The Cutty Wren"
- 1967: "So Much for Dreaming", Ian and Sylvia, as "Cutty Wren"
- 1977: "No Relation", Royston and Heather Wood, as "The Cutty Wren"
- 1977: "Sound Sound Your Instruments of Joy", The Watersons, as "Joy, Health, Love and Peace"
- 1978: Live at Last, Steeleye Span, as "Hunting The Wren"
- 1979: "The Second Nowell", John Roberts, Tony Barrand, Fred Breunig & Steve Woodruff, as "The Cutty Wren"
- 1980: "Tidewave", Robin Dransfield as "The Cutty Wren" – Topic vinyl LP recorded 1974/79/80 published 1980, re-released as Disk 1 of double CD set "A Lighter Touch", 2008.
- 1986: Winter's Turning, Robin Williamson, as "Hunting the Wren"
- 1988: English Rebel Songs 1381-1914, Chumbawamba, as "The Cutty Wren (Part 1)" and "The Cutty Wren (Part 2)"
- 1991: The Bells of Dublin, The Chieftains, six tracks
- 1994: "Yellowknife Evening", Ceilidh Friends, as "The cutty wren"
- 1994: "The Day Dawn", Boys of the Lough, medley of four Scots and Irish wren tunes
- 1994 "The Lovers Enchained", Annwn, as "The Cutty Wren"
- 1996: "Smoked Fish And Friends", Leslie Fish, as "Cutty Wren"
- 1996: Time, Steeleye Span, as "The Cutty Wren"
- 1998: "Wassail!", John Kirkpatrick, as "Hunting the Wren"
- 2001: "Up in the North, Down in the South" Bill Whiting (Virginia) as "I'm Going to the Woods"
- 2003: English Rebel Songs 1381-1984, Chumbawamba, as "The Cutty Wren"
- 2006: Ballad of America volume 2, Matthew Sabatella, as "Billy Barlow"
- 2009: The Awkward Recruit, Mawkin:Causley, as "Cutty Wren"
- 2009: Tales from the Crow Man, Damh the Bard as "The Cutty Wren"
- 2012: Lips of Clay album by Solarference, as "Milder and Mulder"
- 2021: "The Cutty Wren" and "Hela'r Dryw Bach," Says the Never Beyond, an album of traditional Christmas carols of the British Isles by Burd Ellen
- 2021: The Cutty Wren, The Cutty Wren EP, Helen McCookerybook & Willie Gibson, Gare du Nord Records
- 2024: "Voyage", The Longest Johns as "John The Red Nose"
- 2024: "The Cutty Wren", (trad; Roud 236) Week 195, Tim McElwaine, YouTube

There is a Breton tune called "The Wren", played by Maggie Sansone on the album A Celtic Fair (2007), but it is not clear if this is related to the ceremony.

Jack Bruce utilized the melody of "Cutty Wren" for the bass part in the Cream's 1968 song "Pressed Rat and Warthog."

A 1990 parody of the song, titled "Hunting the Cutty Wren", can be found on the album "Oranges and Lemmings" by the Mrs Ackroyd Band, with lyrics by Les Barker, performed by Martin Carthy and June Tabor.

== Other uses ==
Cutty Wren is also the name of a ship in the 2008 novel Nation by Terry Pratchett.

== See also ==
- Cock Robin
- The Boys of Barr na Sráide
