= Riddles Wisely Expounded =

1445 traditional song

Song
- Language: English
- Written: 1450
- Genre: Traditional English song, Child Ballad

"Riddles Wisely Expounded" is a traditional English song, dating at least to 1450. It is Child Ballad 1 and Roud 161, and exists in several variants. The first known tune was attached to it in 1719. The title "Riddles Wisely Expounded" was given by Francis James Child and seems derived from the seventeenth century broadside version "A Noble Riddle Wisely Expounded".

== Origins and Context ==
The motif of riddling in folklore is very ancient, the stories of Oedipus and Samson giving two early examples. The particular form used here matches the folktale Aarne-Thompson type 875 The Clever Girl where a woman wins a husband by her clever answers to riddles. Other tales of this type include What Is the Fastest Thing in the World? and The Wise Little Girl. There are strong parallels with ballads in other languages, with many German, and Scottish and Irish Gaelic versions known to exist. There is also significant crossover with other popular English language ballads, such as The Two Sisters (Child 10) and The False Knight on the Road (Child 3) and The Elfin Knight (Child 2).

== Inter diabolus et virgo, "between the devil and the maiden" (c. 1450) ==
In the earliest surviving version of the song, the "foul fiend" proposes to abduct a maiden unless she can answer a series of riddles. The woman prays to Jesus for wisdom, and answers the riddles correctly.

=== First two verses ===
Wol ye here a wonder thynge (Will you hear a wondrous story,)
Betwyxt a mayd and the fovle fende? (Between a maid and the foul fiend (Devil)?)
Thys spake the fend to the mayd: (Thus spoke the fiend (Devil) to the maid:)
"Beleue on me, mayd, to day." ("Believe on me, maid, today.")

=== Some riddles ===
What ys hyer than ys [the] tre? (What is higher than is the tree?)

What ys dypper than ys the see? (What is deeper than is the sea?)

What ys scharpper than ys the thorne? (What is sharper than is the thorn?)

What ys loder than ys the horne? (What is louder than is the horn?)

What [ys] longger than ys the way? (What is longer(broader) than is the way?)

What is rader than ys the day? (What is redder than is the day?)

=== Some answers ===
Hewene ys heyer than ys the tre. (Heaven is higher than is the tree.)

Helle ys dypper than ys the see. (Hell is deeper than is the sea.)

Hongyr ys scharpper than [ys] the thorne. (Hunger is sharper than is the thorn.)

Thonder ys lodder than ys the horne. (Thunder is louder than is the horn.)

Loukynge ys longer than ys the way. (Looking is longer (broader) than is the way.)

Syn ys rader than ys the day. (Sin is redder than is the day.)

== "A Noble Riddle Wisely Expounded" ==
In a seventeenth century version entitled "A Noble Riddle Wisely Expounded", the words of each verse are interspersed with a chorus phrase "lay the bent to the bonny broom":

"If thou canst answer me questions three,
Lay the bent to the bonny broom
This very day will I marry thee."
Fa la la la, fa la la la ra re

A. L. Lloyd euphemistically describes this as a phrase of "physiological significance", explaining that the word "bent" means a horn, while "broom" most likely refers to the flowering shrub. This specific usage of "bent" is however not supported by e.g. Webster's Third New International Dictionary, although it can be an obsolete term for "something curved or crooked". Alternatively, "bent" can, like "broom", refer to a plant, specifically bentgrass (agrostis); the line has been conjectured to refer to making a bed of broom and bentgrass, or to their use as magical protections against evil.

This version uses the same tune and refrain as a version of The Two Sisters (Child 10).

In later versions, including this one, a knight puts a woman to test before he marries her (sometimes after seducing her); the woman knows the answers, and wins the marriage. In other versions, a devil disguised as a knight tries to carry the woman off.

The riddles vary, but typical ones include:

- What is longer than the way? – love
- What is deeper than the sea? – hell
- What is louder than the horn? – thunder
- What is sharper than a thorn? – hunger
- What is whiter than milk? – snow
- What is softer than silk? – down
- What is worse than woman was? – the devil

== Recent versions and traditional recordings ==
The most commonly found traditional version in recent times, usually entitled "Ninety-nine and ninety", begins roughly as follows:

Now you must answer my questions nine
Sing ninety-nine and ninety,
Or you aren't God's you are one of mine
And who is the weaver's bonny.
What is whiter than milk?
Sing ninety-nine and ninety;
And what is softer than silk?
And who is the weaver's bonny.

Traditional recordings of this version have been made several times in the twentieth century. American recordings include those performed by the Appalachian traditional singer Texas Gladden (recorded by Alan and Elizabeth Lomax in 1941) Nancy Philley of Fayetteville, Arkansas (1963) and Alfreda Peel of Salem, Virginia (1932). Jeff Wesley of Whittlebury, Northamptonshire, England (1988) sang a very similar version, suggesting that this popular version came from England relatively recently.

== Popular versions ==
=== Recordings ===
Album/Single	Performer	Year	Variant
Two Way Trip	Ewan MacColl & Peggy Seeger	1961	The Devil's Nine Questions
Lowlands	Jean Redpath	1980	Riddles Wisely Expounded
Sails of Silver	Steeleye Span	1980	Tell me why Listed as Steeleye Span / Traditional, but a rewrite from the Child ballad, that features the same riddles
Minstrel	Hanita Blair	1992	Riddle Wisely Expounded
Sharper Than the Thorn	Brian Peters	1996	Lay the Bent To the Bonny Broom
A Thousand Miles or More	Kate Burk & Ruth Hazleton	2000	Lay The Bent to the Bonny Broom
Rain and Snow	Elizabeth LaPrelle	2004	"The Devil's Nine Questions"
Waxed	The Demon Barbers	2005	Noble Riddle Wisely Expounded
Fearful Symmetry	Jon Loomes	2005	Riddles Wisley Expounded
Child Ballads	Anaïs Mitchell and Jefferson Hamer	2013	Riddles Wisely Expounded
Riddles and Love Songs	Avon Faire	2017	Riddles Wisely Expounded
A Minstrel Meets a Harper	Mary-Kate Spring Lee & Jim Hancock	2017	Riddles Wisely Expounded
Wilde Roses	Wilde Roses	2017	Riddles Wisely Expounded (Inter Diabolus Et Virgo)
Cold Light	Nick Wyke & Becki Driscoll	2019	Riddles Wisely Expounded
The Confluence	Stray Hens	2019	Riddles Wisely Expounded (Bonny Broom)
Each Machine	Carolyn Kendrick	2024	The Devil’s Nine Questions

Modern literary retellings include Juniper, Gentian, and Rosemary by Pamela Dean and "A Diorama of the Infernal Regions, or the Devil's Ninth Question," by Andy Duncan.

== See also ==
- List of the Child Ballads
- The Fause Knight Upon the Road
- The Elfin Knight
- Proud Lady Margaret
- The Riddle Song
