= Wren Day =

Irish and Manx tradition on 26 December

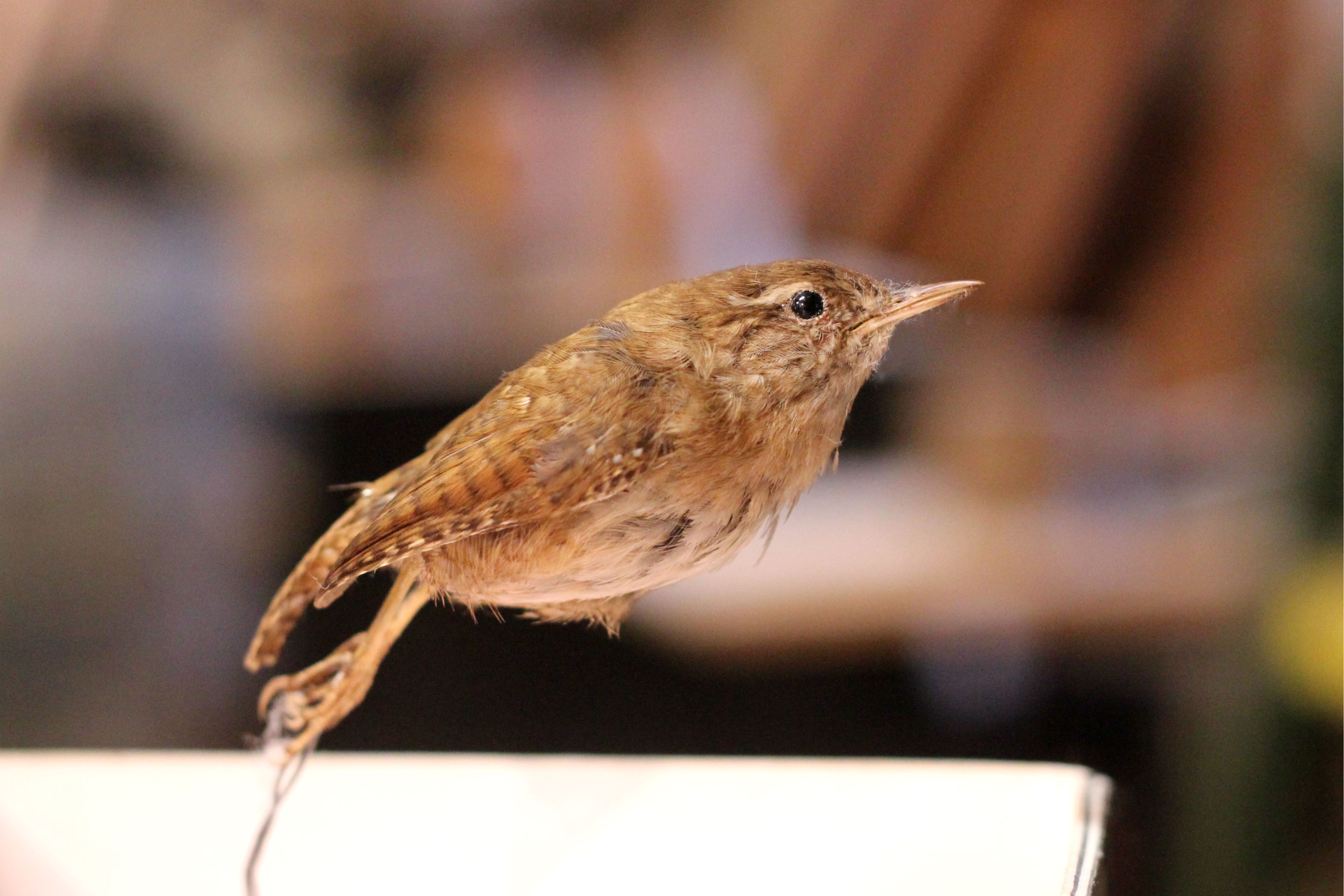
A taxidermy wren used for Hunt the Wren Day in Douglas, Isle of Man

Wren Day (Irish: Lá an Dreoilín), or Hunt the Wren Day (Manx: Shelg yn Dreean), or Hunt the Wren (Manx: Shelg yn Dreean), is an Irish and Manx custom on 26 December, Saint Stephen's Day (known in most of Ulster as Boxing Day). Traditionally, men and boys hunted a wren, which was revered as the 'king of the birds'. They displayed it on top of a staff decorated with holly, ivy and ribbons, or in a decorated box on top of a pole. This was paraded around the neighbourhood by a group of 'Wrenboys'—typically dressed in straw masks, greenery and colourful motley clothing—who sang songs and played music in exchange for donations. This was meant to ensure prosperity for the coming year. Afterwards, the wren was buried. On the Isle of Man, they held a funeral for the wren and danced around a 'wren pole'.

There were similar New Year traditions in parts of western Britain and France until the nineteenth century. There are several folk tales about the origin of the wren hunt. It is speculated that the tradition derives from ancient Celtic paganism and was originally a sacrifice associated with the winter solstice. In most places, Wren Day gradually died out following industrialisation, but it has been undergoing a revival since the late 20th century. Today, the wren is no longer hunted, and a mock or stuffed wren is used instead. It is especially popular on the Isle of Man and in Kerry.

== Irish tradition ==
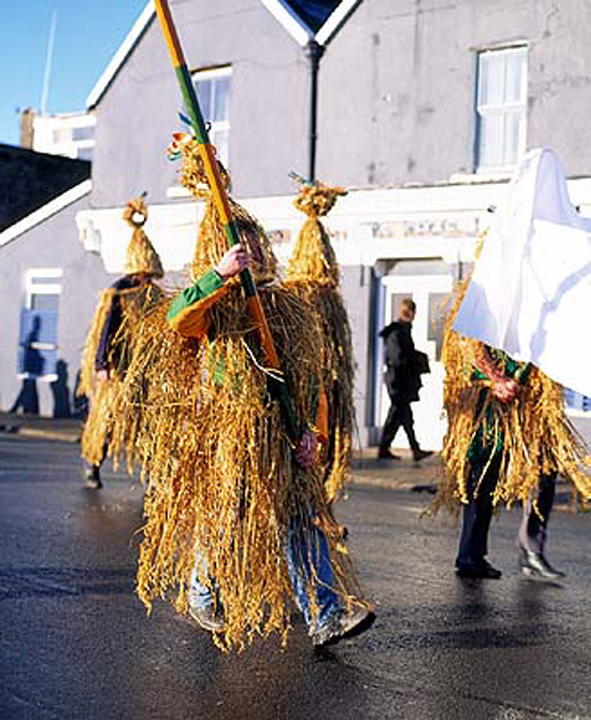
Wrenboys on Saint Stephen's Day in Dingle, Ireland.

Historically, and up until the mid-20th century in many parts of rural Ireland, groups of men and boys hunted a wren (also pronounced wran) on Saint Stephen's Day. They beat the bushes and hedges with sticks, and when a wren flew out they tried to down the bird by throwing sticks, stones and other objects at it. Whoever killed the wren was believed to have good luck for a year.

The dead wren was usually placed inside a 'wren bush', which was usually a ball of holly, ivy and colourful ribbons fastened to the top of a long staff. Sometimes the 'wren bush' was a wheel-shaped or ball-shaped frame of evergreen wreaths and ribbons. A group of 'Wrenboys' or 'Droluns' (Irish: lucht an dreoilín) then carried it in procession around the neighbourhood. In some areas they wore straw masks and costumes, while in others they wore masks made from the skin of a goat, a rabbit or a horse. In Kerry, they were accompanied by a hobby horse called the Láir Bhán. They sang songs about the wren, to the sound of drums, fifes and melodeons. The Wrenboys visited each house in the community—except those which had recently been affected by a death—collecting money, food or drink. This was meant to ensure prosperity for each household in the coming year. At the end of the day, the wren was buried, and sometimes given human burial rites by being placed in a tiny coffin and keened. The money, food and drink was used for a 'wren dance', sometimes called the 'wren's wake', which was meant to bring unmarried people together.

Today, the wren hunt no longer takes place, but Wren Day has survived or been revived in a few towns and villages, mainly in the southern parts of Ireland, such as in Dingle in County Kerry. Groups of Wrenboys hold small parades and carry around a stuffed or fake wren. They usually collect money for charity or to host a dance or "Wren Ball" for the town.

=== Song ===
Whilst going from house to house, the Wrenboys would sing a song, of which there are many variations, asking for donations. One variation sung in Edmondstown, County Dublin, ran as such (the last two lines of which are used in several festive British begging songs and rhymes including "Christmas is Coming"):

The wren the wren the king of all birds
St Stephen's Day was caught in the furze
Her clothes were all torn- her shoes were all worn
Up with the kettle and down with the pan
Give us a penny to bury the "wran"
If you haven't a penny, a halfpenny will do
If you haven't a halfpenny, God bless you!

In a 1978 recording, the sean-nós singer Seosamh Ó hÉanaí discusses Wren Day activities and the lore behind the tradition. He sings a macaronic, English-Irish text: "Dreoilín, dreoilín, Rí na nÉan (Wren, wren, King of Birds)".

== Manx tradition ==
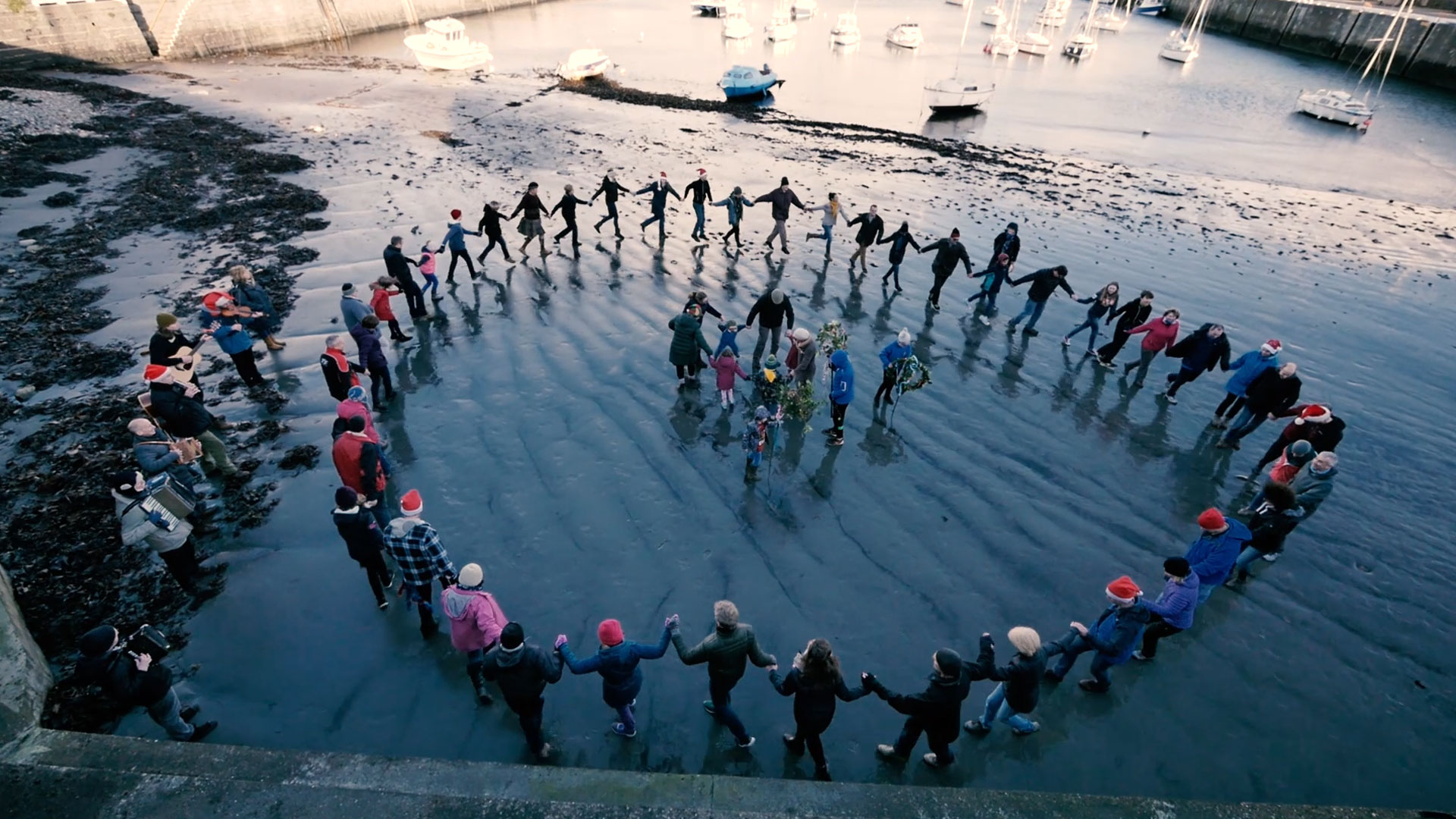
Hunt the Wren on the sand at Port St Mary, 2016

Traditionally, a wren was hunted on the Isle of Man every Saint Stephen's Day, as in Ireland. Usually, the wren's body would be hung inside the 'wren bush' – a ball-shaped frame made from two crossed wreaths of holly or ivy, decorated with ribbons. In some villages, the wren's body was displayed in a 'wren house' – a small wooden box with windows, decorated with greenery and ribbons. These wren bushes or wren houses were held aloft on poles and taken around the neighbourhood by 'wrenboys', some of whom were decked in greenery or flew coloured banners. Singing "Hunt the Wren" (Manx: Shelg yn Dreean) and beating drums, they went from house to house asking for coins. When a coin was given, the donor might receive a feather from the wren. These feathers were kept or worn as an amulet to guard against supernatural harm and witchcraft.

At the end of the day, a funeral was held for the wren and it was buried at the parish church by torchlight. George Waldron recorded in 1731 that they buried the wren "with a whimsical kind of solemnity, singing dirges over her in the Manx language". According to folklorist Mona Douglas, after the dead wren was buried, a living wren was placed in a wicker cage inside the wren bush, and the people danced around it. When the dance ended, the wren was set free, and the bush was burned on the dead wren's grave. Manx folklore held that the wren's spirit would be reborn each year.

According to Douglas, in the eighteenth century the Manx church were hostile to the ceremony, but knew they could not prevent it. She wrote that when the group arrived at the church with the sacrificed wren, the vicar "took good care to absent himself from the proceedings, for they were frowned upon by the church at that time as being Pagan and superstitious".

The tradition was revived on the Isle of Man during the 1990s, although a wren is no longer killed. Today, it mainly involves music, singing and dancing around a decorated wren bush or wren pole in which a stuffed or fake wren is placed.

== Origin ==
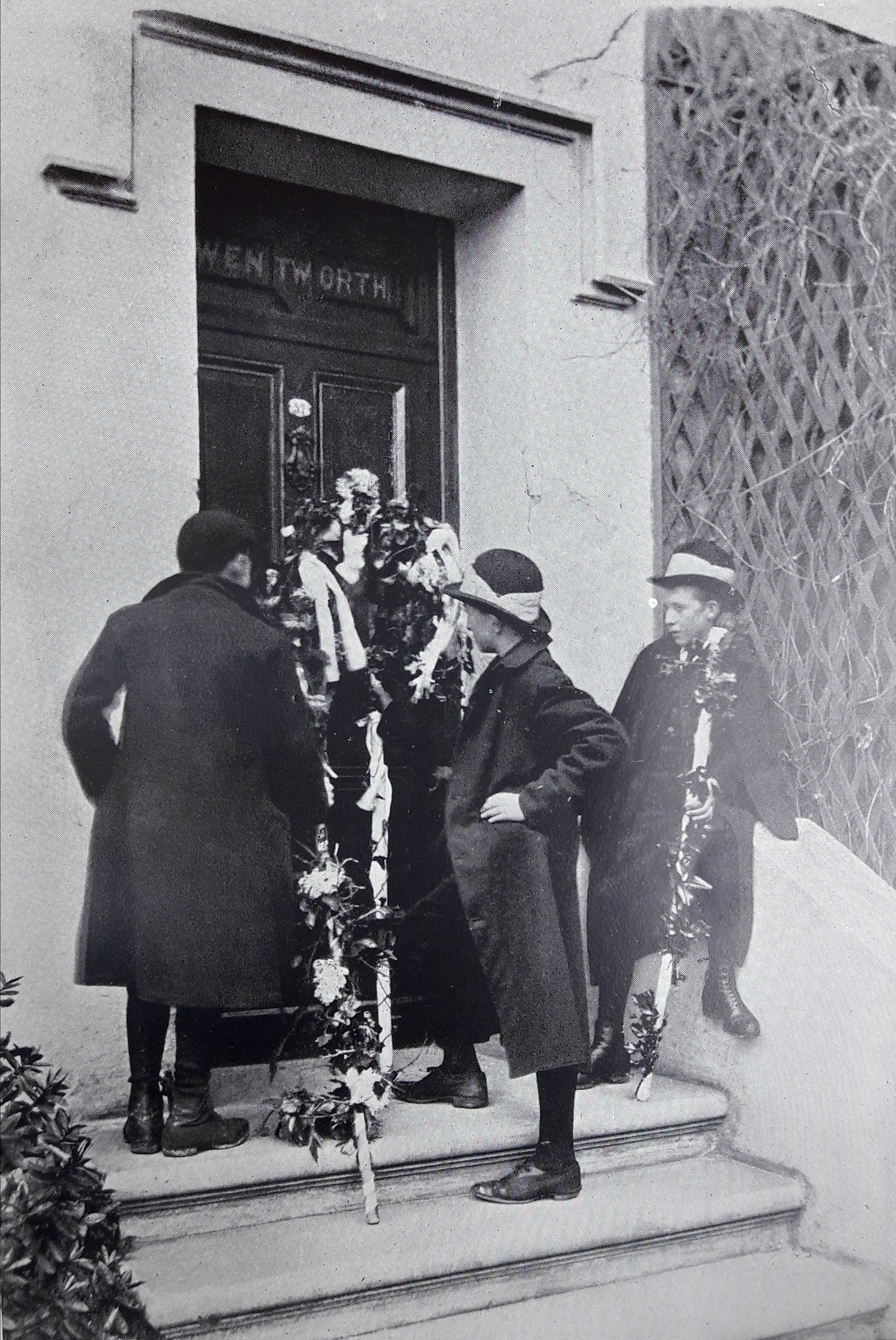
Wrenboys in Ramsey, Isle of Man, 1904

In regions where Wren Day was traditional, the wren was deeply revered; it was deemed a special bird, the "king of all birds", and harming it was taboo. However, on Wren Day this taboo was "replaced by highly complex rituals that grew out of ancient beliefs". The ninth century Cormac's Glossary derives the Old Irish word for "wren", drean, from druí-én, meaning "druid bird", and says it is "a bird that makes prophecies". Another early Irish text, the Life of Saint Moling, calls the wren "the magus bird, because some take auguries from it".

The origin of wren day and the wren hunt is obscure. According to Elizabeth Atwood Lawrence, "evidence suggests an origin in the far distant past". Many scholars believe that the wren hunt has ancient pagan origins and is related to animal sacrifice and the winter solstice. Edward Allworthy Armstrong says "there is much to suggest that the Wren Hunt was sacrificial. The bird was reverenced but killed at one season only, the feathers were regarded as talismans, the body was sometimes buried with respect, the chief human actor was regarded as in some sense a king, and the bird itself was given a royal title". Folklorist Christina Hole speculates that it may have derived from the periodic sacrifice of a sacred king. In Celtic tradition, the king's rule was linked to the health and prosperity of the land. According to Lawrence, the belief may have been that at midwinter, "the faltering forces of nature" had to be renewed, by ritually killing the wren who represented the old king and the old year. Similarly, folklorist Sylvie Muller sees the wren as a stand-in for man, and sees the wren hunt as representing a sacrifice to ensure the bountifulness of nature. According to Muller, this comes from the pre-farming belief that mankind owes a life debt to nature in return for the life that we take from it.

=== Folk tales ===
There are several folk tales about the origin of the wren hunt. Armstrong wrote that the "multiplicity and inconsistency" of the stories "show that we are dealing with a very ancient ceremonial, the origin of which has been forgotten". Christina Hole described the stories as "mere rationalizations of a ritual that appears to be older than Christianity".

Some stories say that it is hunted on Saint Stephen's Day because a wren wakened the guards when Saint Stephen tried to escape from captivity. Another says that the saint had a pet wren that was stoned to death along with him. Yet another rationalizes it as a memorial of the Massacre of the Innocents.

There is a widespread folk tale about how the wren (or gold-crested wren) outwitted the eagle to become 'king of the birds'. This story has been recorded since ancient times and is found all over Europe. In some Irish versions, the wren must pay for having gained this royal title, or is put under a geis (a mystical taboo) that it must not fly higher than the top of a bush. This is explained as the reason the wren is hunted once a year. In Irish mythology, kings are likewise often put under a geis, and they mystically die or are killed when they break their geis.

Possibly the earliest written reference to a wren hunt is a medieval Irish legend about Saint Moling. It says that the saint cursed the wren to be hunted by young people because it ate his pet fly. Other legends say that Irish people hunt the wren once a year because it alerted their enemies as the Irish were about to ambush them; these enemies are variously said to be the Vikings, Cromwell's army, or the Williamite army.

In Manx folklore, the origin of the wren hunt is linked with a beautiful fairy woman. The story goes that the woman enchanted all the men of the island to follow her in hope of marrying her, and they neglected their homes and fields. The fairy woman lured the men into the sea where they drowned. One day a hero found a way of averting her charms. But before she could be defeated, she shapeshifted into a wren and flew away. However, she was cursed to re-appear once a year as a wren, and this is why the wren is hunted on this day.

In Welsh mythology, the hero Lleu Llaw Gyffes (Lleu of the Skilful Hand) gains his byname by striking a wren with perfect aim, "between the sinew and the bone".

== Parallel traditions ==
The typical wren hunt occurred in Ireland, the Isle of Man, Wales, England and France, "areas where Celtic tradition was firmly entrenched". Although there was some regional variation, the basic pattern of the ritual was the same wherever it occurred. In Britain and Ireland, the wren hunt was usually held on Saint Stephen's Day, but wren hunts also took place on Christmas Eve, New Year's Eve, New Year's Day, and Twelfth Day (5 January). By the early 20th century, industrialization and changing beliefs had begun to erode the tradition.

The Wrenboys have some similarities with the skeklers of Shetland.

=== Wales ===
In Wales, the tradition of 'hunting the wren' (Welsh: Hela'r Dryw) took place every Twelfth Day, and the practice continued in Pembrokeshire until the beginning of the twentieth century. Like in some Manx traditions, in Wales the dead wren was typically placed in a "Wren House" – a small wooden box with windows, decorated with greenery and ribbons – which was then carried around the neighbourhood by "wren bearers". In some cases, "wrenboys" caught a live wren and placed it in the Wren House, and then the wrenboys called on people to make offerings to the little "king" until the end of the day, when the bird was set free.

=== England ===
The tradition was found in parts of England, but it gradually died out or was put down by the authorities by the mid-nineteenth century. In the late 20th century, Pete Jennings and the Old Glory Molly Dancers revived the wren hunt in Suffolk, and it has been performed in Middleton on the evening of every Boxing Day since 1994.

=== France ===
There are similar mid-winter wren ceremonies in parts of France. James George Frazer describes in The Golden Bough a wren-hunting ritual in Carcassonne, held in early December. The Fête du Roi de l'Oiseau (festival of the king of birds) was first recorded in 1524 at Puy-en-Velay, and is still celebrated. In parts of France, whoever was first to strike, catch or kill the wren was honoured with the title of King. He led a torchlit procession around the town, carrying the wren on a pole. They stopped at each house, and wrote vive le roi! (long live the king) on each door.

The Abbey of Saint-Germain-des-Prés has a document from 1663 in which the prior undertakes to give thirty pots of wine each year to the bacheliers, if they bring him a living wren as tribute at Christmas or New Year. A captured wren was also given as tribute to the priory of Châteauponsac each New Year's Day. The man who caught the wren became "King of the Fête" and the wren was paraded to the church accompanied by fife and drum.

=== Galicia ===
In Galicia, Spain, the Caceria do rei Charlo (Chase of King Charles) was performed around midwinter. The inhabitants of Vilanova de Lourenzá would chase down a wren and, after tying it to a pole, would parade it and show it to the abbot of the local monastery, who would then offer them food and drink and appoint two leaders of the local town council out of the four candidates proposed by townsmen. This tradition has been recorded since the 16th century. It is unclear which specific date this tradition was performed on; sources call it "New Year's Day", which may not refer to the New Year on the Gregorian calendar but instead to the day after Christmas, which at that time was considered the end of the year.

== Popular songs ==
In 1955 Liam Clancy recorded "The Wran Song" ("The Wren Song"), which was sung in Ireland by wrenboys. In 1972 Steeleye Span recorded "The King" on Please to See the King, which also reflects the tradition; on their album Time they made another version, "The Cutty Wren", named after the traditional English folk song. "Hunting the Wren" appears on John Kirkpatrick's album Wassail!. The Chieftains made a collection of wrenboy tunes on The Bells of Dublin. In the song "The Boys of Barr na Sráide", which is based on a poem by Sigerson Clifford, the wren hunt is also a prominent theme. Lankum's 2019 album The Livelong Day includes a track called "Hunting the Wren" that references several of the legends and practices connected with Wren Day.

"The Wren [Wran] Song" is also on the Clancy Brothers and Tommy Makem's 1995 album Ain't It Grand Boys: A Collection of Unissued Gems, as the last song in "Children's Medley".

== See also ==
- Mummer's Day
- The Armagh Rhymers
