= What Is the Fastest Thing in the World? =

Traditional Greek folk tale

What Is the Fastest Thing in the World? is a Greek fairy tale collected by Georgios A. Megas in Folktales of Greece.

It is Aarne-Thompson type 875 and has many Greek and Slavic variants, generally revolving about the exchange of clever answers. This type of tale is the commonest European tale dealing with witty exchanges. In ballad form, the clever answers to the riddles, and the winning of a husband by them, are found in Child ballad 1, Riddles Wisely Expounded.

== Synopsis ==
Two brothers argued over how they should split their land, some of which was good and some bad. The king sent riddles to them: whoever guessed the riddles would get good land. The first riddle was what was the fastest thing in the world. The stupid brother's daughter told him what to say; his brother guessed a bird or a horse, and the stupid brother said the mind. The second riddle was what was the heaviest thing in the world; the clever brother guessed stone or iron, and the stupid brother repeated his daughter's answer: fire because no one could lift it. The third was what was the most important thing in the world; the clever brother guessed bread or money, and the stupid brother repeated his daughter's answer: ground, because they needed it to stand on.

The king gave the stupid brother the land and asked how he got the answers. He confessed it was his daughter. The king married the daughter, on the condition that she never meddled in his affairs; if she did, she would have to return home, although he would give her one thing, whatever she valued most in the castle.

One day, the queen saw a man steal a packsaddle and quarrel with the rightful owner. She called out which was the rightful owner, and the king said she had meddled and must go home. She asked him to eat one last meal with her, and then she drugged it. When he was asleep, she put him in the carriage and went home. When the king woke, she told him she was entitled to him, because she valued him most of everything in the castle. The king took her back to the castle and gave her the right to judge all his affairs.

== See also ==
- The Peasant's Wise Daughter
- The Wise Little Girl
