= Magdalena Falewicz =

Polish operatic soprano

Magdalena Falewicz (born 11 February 1946) is a Polish operatic soprano.

== Career ==
Born in Lublin, Falewicz began studying in Warsaw and made her debut there in 1971. From 1972 to 1979, she was a member of the ensemble at the Komische Oper Berlin. There she sang among others Oscar in Un ballo in maschera, the Contessa in Le nozze di Figaro (direction: Walter Felsenstein) and Madama Butterfly (mise-en-scène: Joachim Herz).

From 1979 to the mid-1990s, she was in the ensemble of the Berlin State Opera. There she sang among others Contessa, Donna Elvira, Pamina (also in the 1980 Japan guest performance), Marzelline, Eva (also in the 1987 Japan guest performance), Giulietta, Rosalinde, Micaela, Tatjana, Liu and Zdenka.

Guest performances took her among others to the FRG, the USSR and the USA as well as Eastern and Western Europe.

She was married to the US tenor John Moulson until his death.

== Recording ==
- 1977 Complete recording Ein Sommernachtstraum by Felix Mendelssohn Bartholdy, directed by Günther Herbig (Soprano soloist)
- 1978 Complete recording Alfonso und Estrella by Franz Schubert, directed by Otmar Suitner (Ein Mädchen)
- 1980 Complete recording Die Kluge by Carl Orff, directed by Herbert Kegel (title role)
- 1982 Complete recording Orfeo ed Euridice by Christoph Willibald Gluck, directed by Sigiswald Kuijken (Amor)
