= The Fause Knight Upon the Road =

Traditional song

"The False Knight Upon the Road" is a British ballad, collected and published as Child ballad 3, Roud 20. It features a riddling exchange between a schoolboy and a "false knight", the devil in disguise. As to its provenance, it is presumed to not be much older than its first publication in 1824.

== Synopsis ==
Across numerous versions differing significantly in lyric content, the consistent themes are:

- The knight asks the boy where he is going, and what he is carrying (books).
- He asks after the sheep, which belong to the boy and his mother, and how many belong to the knight – as many as have blue tails.
- The knight may wish him in a tree, the boy to have a ladder, the knight to have it break, and so on.
- Throughout any exchange, the boy is described as stood/standing fast/still. This appears to be the condition that will save him.

== Commentary ==
The boy's ability to evade the devil may spring from the devil's inability to dumbfound him; gaining power over people by this means is a motif found in other folktales. In some respect, the ability of the child to circumvent the fause knight can be seen as a rite of passage.

This ballad's narrative is quite clearly structured as a rite of passage the child's status as a speaker changes. His character is developed, transformed in a story that shows the different ways in which a person moves from one category to the next. The ballad portrays the speech contexts in which the confrontation between the child and a threatening adult is being performed, foreshadowing the speech contexts in which children and adults might interact as equals or, if he learns well, a child travels to school and then out into the world, revealing speech appropriate to and necessary for these contexts. The ballad implies that children in school should answer questions but here an adult in the form of a threatening stranger may be rebutted in a forthright manner. In addition to these very serious and quite obvious rationales of learning to speak well, there may be associated seemingly playful but profound functions in cognitive, social development.

A Swedish variant features the little boy, but an old woman, presumably a witch, in the place of the knight.

== Recordings and settings ==
Recordings

- The Blue Velvet Band recorded this song as "The Knight Upon the Road" on Sweet Moments (1969).
- Tim Hart and Maddy Prior recorded this song as "False Knight on the Road" on Summer Solstice (1971).
- Steeleye Span recorded this song as "False Knight on the Road" on Please to See the King (1971) and Live at Last (1978).
- The School of Scottish Studies issued three fragments sung by Bella Higgins, Duncan McPhee and Nellie MacGregor on The Muckle Sangs: Classic Scots Ballads (1975).
- Oysterband recorded this song on the CD The Oxford Girl & Other Stories (2008) and on the CD Single "This Is The Voice" (1999).
- Jane Siberry recorded her own variant of the song on her 2000 album Hush. The song was retitled "False False Fly" and the boy protagonist recast as a girl.
- Stephan Said recorded "The False Knight on the Road" and a version re-written as an anti-war anthem on the 2002 EP The Bell which included Pete Seeger and Tara Nevins.
- Fleet Foxes recorded this song as the b-side to the 7" release of "Mykonos" in 2009. This version features different lyrics to the original.
- Richard Thompson has performed a version of this song on recent tours.
- Matt Ender issued an album Miles of Skye with this song titled "The False Fly".
- Barry Gleeson issued an album Path across the ocean with this song titled "The false, false fly".
- Gilmore & Roberts recorded an arrangement of this song on their 2012 album The Innocent Left. It was entitled "False Knight" and again recast the protagonist as a girl.
- John Langstaff recorded a version of this song on Nottamun Town (EMI 1964, remaster 2003).
- Oli Steadman, on his song collection "365 Days Of Folk". (2024)

Settings

- Runa recorded this song as "The False Knight on the Road" on Current Affairs in 2014.
- Set by Benjamin Britten in his Eight Folk Song Arrangements (for high voice and harp). There is a recording of this by Philip Langridge and Osian Ellis on #13 of the Naxos English Song Series (8.557222 - Originally released by Collins Classics)

== See also ==
- List of the Child Ballads
- "Riddles Wisely Expounded"
- "The Elfin Knight"
