= The Armagh Rhymers =

Northern Ireland folk music and theatre group

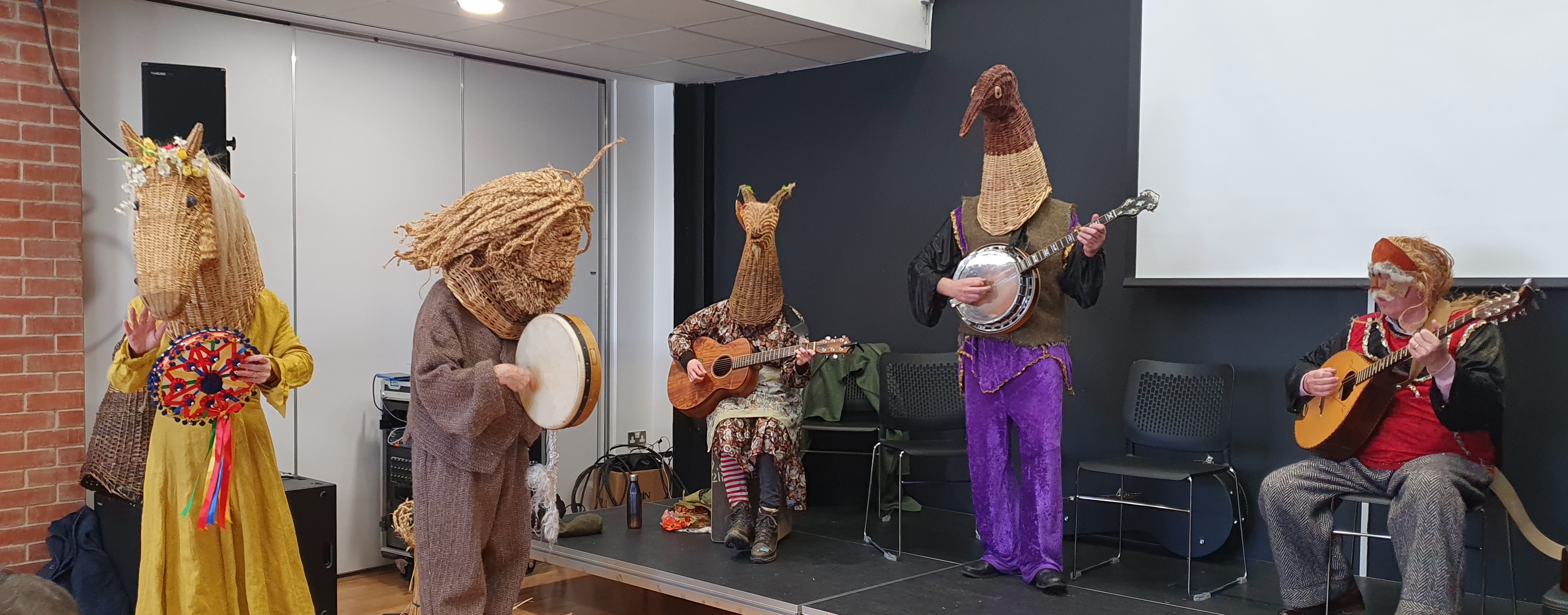
- The Armagh Rhymers performing at Aonach Mhacha in March 2023

Background information
- Genres: Irish traditional music
- Members: Dara Vallely; Anne Hart; Annie June Callaghan; Ciara Cullen; Larry Harte; Eilís NicLochlainn
- Website: armaghrhymers.com

The Armagh Rhymers are a folk music and theatre ensemble based in Northern Ireland whose work is inspired by traditional Irish performances such as Mummers' plays, Wren Boys, and biddymen.

== History ==
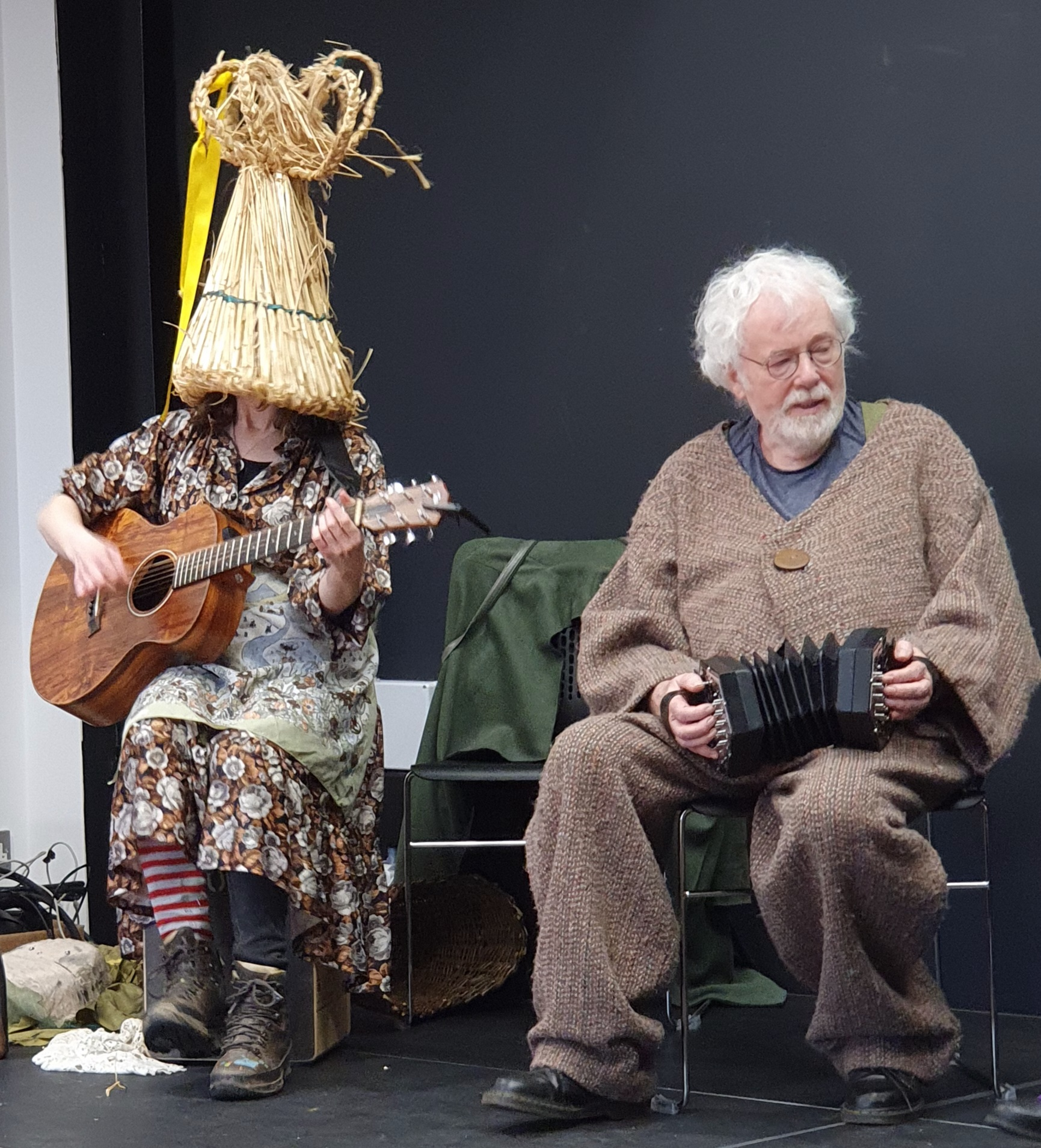
The Armagh Rhymers performing at Aonach Mhacha in March 2023

The Armagh Rhymers group was founded in the 1970s by Dara Vallely, and is one of the few groups on the island of Ireland preserving the tradition of rhyming and mumming. The group perform using woven flax, willow, and straw masks, inspired by the traditional Mummers' masks with outfits mostly made from hessian sackcloth. They incorporate storytelling, music, poetry and song into their performances.

The group have a collection of over 30 masks used in different performances. The oldest mask is a horse's head made by James Mulholland when the group was founded. Their performances are seasonal, marking the Irish festivals including Saint Brigid's Day, Saint Patrick's Day, Bealtaine, and Wren Day and have inspired the poets Seamus Heaney and Michael Longley. The group is the oldest professional theatre in education company.

They tour internationally to festivals including Milk International Festival, Canada, AssiteJ Children's Theatre Festival Korea, Milwaukee Irish Fest, TradFest Edinburgh, and the IMBOLC Festival. They have performed numerous times at the Glastonbury Festival since the 1980s. The group played with Lambeg drummers at the Ulster Folk Museum at an event called Mummers and Drummers in 2019.

Past members of the group include Peter J. Shortall, Brendan Bailey, and Barry Lynch.
