= Proud Lady Margaret =

Traditional song

"Proud Lady Margaret" (Roud 37, Child 47) is an English-language folk song.

== Synopsis ==
A man arrives at the heroine's castle to woo her. She is frequently critical of him, on the grounds that his clothing shows him to be no gentleman. In most variants, he taxes her with riddles such as "What's the first thing in flower?" (primrose), and in the end, she accepts his suit. He reveals that he is her brother and a ghost, sometimes after she has said she will go with him and he must forbid, as it will kill her. He tells her he has come to curb her haughtiness.

== Commentary ==
This appears to be the compound of two ballads: one of a proud princess being humbled by a clever wooer, and the other of a dead soul rebuking the living.

Many of the elements of this are found in other ballads: the riddles from "Riddles Wisely Expounded", the suitor who proves to be a brother in "The Bonnie Banks o Fordie", the lover who returns as a ghost and must forbid the beloved from following him, as in "The Unquiet Grave".

== See also ==
- List of the Child Ballads
