= Six Studies in English Folk Song =

1926 chamber song by Ralph Vaughan Williams

Ralph Vaughan Williams c. 1920

Six Studies in English Folk Song is a piece of chamber music written by English composer Ralph Vaughan Williams in 1926. It is a collection of six English folk songs set for cello and piano. Each song follows the same format: presentation of the tune in the solo line, followed by a full iteration of the folk song in the piano with an ornamented solo line.

Originally written for cellist May Mukle and piano, Vaughan Williams wrote that his aim in setting the songs was for them to be “treated with love.” It has been transcribed by the composer and others for violin, viola, English horn, clarinet, bassoon, alto sax, euphonium, and tuba.

Never straying from his English roots, Vaughan Williams sought to organically weave elements of his native music into all of his compositions, rather than imitate it. One of the earliest researchers in ethnomusicology, he traveled the British countryside recording and transcribing folk music directly from its source.

== Movements ==
Six Studies in English Folk Song is composed of six movements:

1. Adagio ('Lovely on the Water') in E modal minor
2. Andante sostenuto ('Spurn Point') in E♭
3. Larghetto ('Van Diemen's Land') in D modal minor
4. Lento ('She Borrowed Some of Her Mother’s Gold') in D
5. Andante tranquillo ('The Lady and the Dragoon’) in G
6. Allegro vivace ('As I walked over London Bridge') in A modal minor
