= Die Kluge =

1943 opera by Carl Orff

- Märchenoper (fairy-tale opera) by Carl Orff
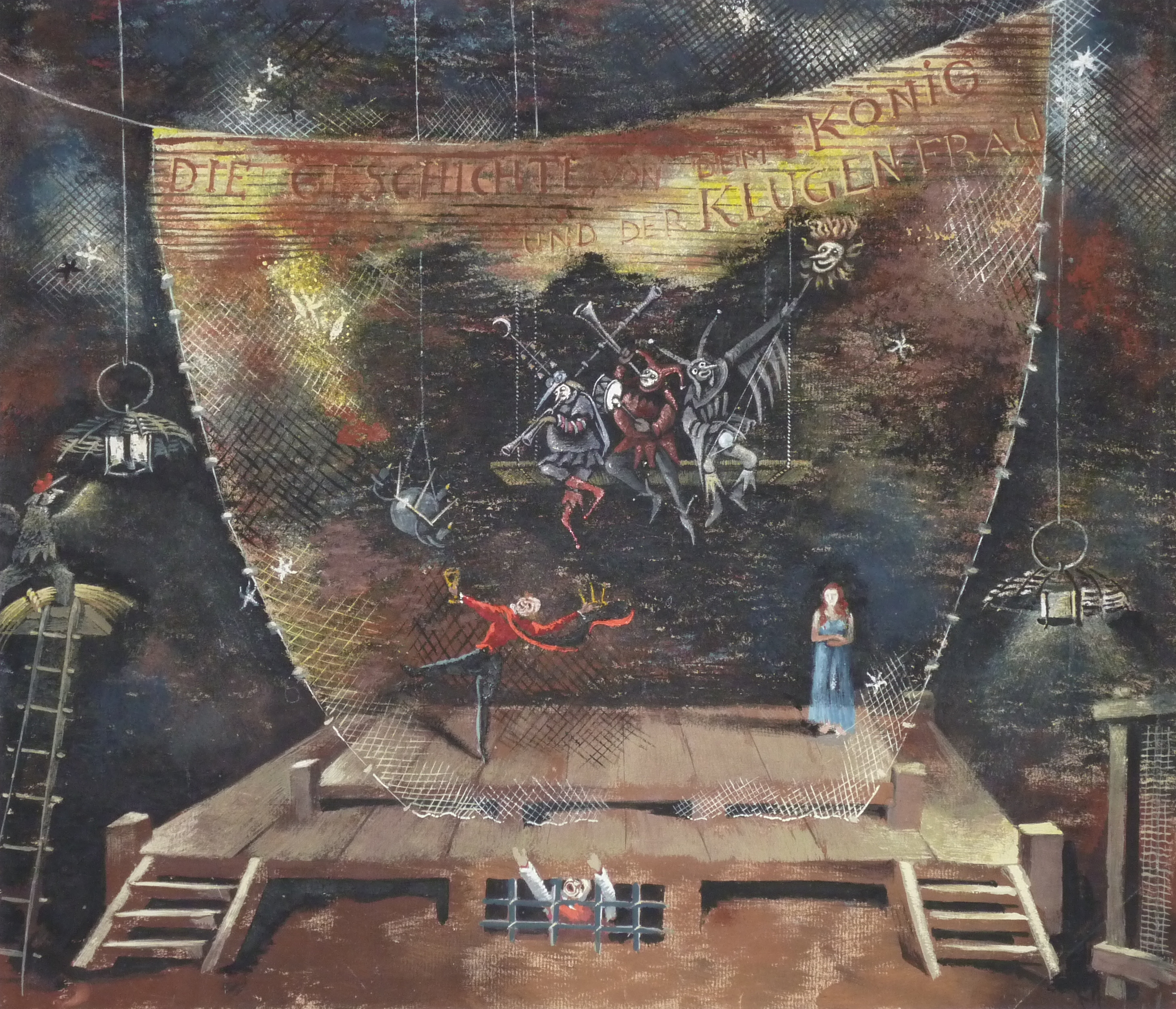
- Draft for the set by Helmut Jürgens, the designer for the premiere in 1943, for a performance in Munich in 1948
- Librettist: Carl Orff
- Language: German
- Based on: "Die Kluge Bauerntochter" ("The Peasant's Wise Daughter") from Grimms' Fairy Tales
- Premiere: 20 February 1943; Frankfurt Opera

Die Kluge. Die Geschichte von dem König und der klugen Frau (The Wise [Girl]. The Story of the King and the Wise Woman) is an opera in 12 scenes written by Carl Orff. It premiered at the Frankfurt Opera, Germany, on 20 February 1943. Orff referred to this opera as a Märchenoper (fairy tale opera). The composer also wrote the libretto, based on "Die Kluge Bauerntochter" ("The Peasant's Wise Daughter") from Grimms' Fairy Tales. A performance lasts for about 90 minutes and is often paired with Orff's Der Mond.

The first performance in Belgium was given at La Monnaie in 1957 with Huc Santana as the King. The United States premiere was given by the San Francisco Opera at the San Francisco Opera House on October 3, 1958 with Lawrence Winters as the King, Lorenzo Alvary as the Peasant, and Leontyne Price as the Peasant's Daughter.

== Roles ==
Roles, voice types, premiere cast
Role	Voice type	Premiere cast, 20 February 1943 Conductor: Otto Winkler
The king	baritone	Rudolf Gonszar
The peasant	bass	Emil Staudenmeyer
The peasant's wise daughter	soprano	Coba Wackers
Prison governor	bass	Emil Staudenmeyer
Donkey owner	tenor	Oskar Wittazscheck
Mule owner	baritone	Günther Ambrosius
First vagabond	tenor	Emil Seidenspinner
Second vagabond	baritone	Paul Kötter
Third vagabond	bass	Herbert Hesse

== Synopsis ==
The plot of the opera is that a poor peasant finds on his land a mortar made out of gold. He decides to take it to the king, thinking that he will be rewarded for being a loyal subject. His wise daughter tells him not to, because the king will throw him in the dungeons thinking that he has stolen the pestle, which in truth he didn't find.

The daughter's prediction comes true, and this is the beginning of the opera. When the king learns that the daughter had wisely known what his actions would be he sends for her to come before him. He tells her she has "talked a noose around her neck" and will give her two choices for how to save her life. She can either gamble for it, or answer three riddles.

The wise daughter chooses to answer the three riddles, and saves her life. The king makes her his queen and all seems happy.

The opera is only half over though. Three scoundrels have stirred up some trouble between the owners of a donkey and of a mule. One morning they found a baby donkey between the two beasts, and the mule owner ridiculously thought it could be his. The king agrees that since the baby was closer to the mule it must belong to it. The queen overhears this and sets up the donkey owner to show the king the error of his foolish judgment. The king realizes that his new wife is mocking him and working against his decision and he sends her away with a large box and tells her to take whatever she wishes and leave. The queen drugs her husband with opiates in his wine, and the opera happily ends with him waking up inside the box, and acknowledging that she truly is a wise woman. She contradicts him and says that no one who loves can be truly wise. Also at the end, the peasant finds the golden pestle which got him sent to the dungeons in the first place.

== Orchestra ==
Die Kluge is scored for the following orchestra:

- Woodwind: 3 flutes (all 3 doubling piccolos), 3 oboes (3rd doubling English horn), 3 clarinets in B-flat, A, C and E-flat (1 doubling bass clarinet), 2 bassoons, contrabassoon
- Brass: 4 horns in F, 3 trumpets, 3 trombones, tuba
- Percussion (4 players): timpani, bass drum, 2 snare drums, tenor drum, tambourine, triangle, lithophone, sand rattle, antique cymbals, various Turkish cymbals, tamtam, ratchet, sleigh bells, castanets, tubular bells, glockenspiel
- Other instruments: harp, celesta, piano, strings
- Stage band: 3 trumpets, various drums, glockenspiel, organ

== Recordings ==
- Elisabeth Schwarzkopf – Marcel Cordes – Gottlob Frick – Philharmonia Orchestra – Wolfgang Sawallisch. Prologue and epilogue spoken by the composer. EMI 1956
- Lucia Popp – Thomas Stewart – Gottlob Frick – Münchner Rundfunkorchester – Kurt Eichhorn. Directed by the composer. Ariola-Eurodisc 1970
- Magdalena Falewicz – Karl-Heinz Stryczek – Reiner Süß – Rundfunk-Sinfonie-Orchester Leipzig – Herbert Kegel. ETERNA 1982

== Noted arias ==
- "Oh hätt’ ich meiner Tochter nur geglaubt", the peasant
- "Schuh-schuhu, es fallen dem König die Augen zu", the wise girl
