= André Huc-Santana =

André Huc-Santana, also known on the stage as Huc Santana, (11 October 1912 – 21 January 1982) was a French operatic bass. Born in France and raised in Argentina, he had an active international performance career from the late 1930s into the mid 1960s. His voice is preserved on several recordings made for Pathé-Marconi.

== Life and career ==
The son of Adrien Huc-Santana and his wife Laure Charlier, André Huc-Santana was born on 11 October 1912 in Toulouse, France. He grew up in Buenos Aires, Argentina. He made his professional opera debut in 1939 at the Opéra de Marseille in Gustave Charpentier's Louise. In 1940 he married Arlette Balthazar.

Huc Santana became a resident artist at the Paris Opéra in 1943 where he first appeared as Sparafucile in Giuseppe Verdi's Rigoletto. Other roles he sang at that opera house included the Commendatore in Mozart's Don Giovanni, Friar Laurence in Gounod's Roméo et Juliette, Hunding in Die Walküre, Méphistophélès's in Faust, Phanuel in Massenet's Hérodiade, the high priest Ramfis in Verdi's Aida, the Old Hebrew in Samson et Dalila, and the title roles in Boris Godunov and Mefistofele.

In 1946 Huc Santana performed for the first time at the Opéra-Comique as Don Basilio in Rossini's The Barber of Seville, and from this point on spent the next twenty years appearing as a leading singer at both the Opéra-Comique and the Paris Opera. He also sang regularly at the Opéra de Monte-Carlo from 1947-1951 where he was performed all four villains in The Tales of Hoffmann and the title roles in Don Giovanni and Don Quichotte. He appeared multiple times at La Monnaie from 1954–1958 where his repertoire included the Abbé in Henri Tomasi's Don Juan de Mañara, composer Salieri in Mozart and Salieri, and Peachum in Benjamin Britten's revised version of The Beggar’s Opera. He had a major success in Brussels in 1954 as Boris Gudonov with critics hailing him as a successor to Feodor Chaliapin, and in 1957 he appeared at La Monnaie as the King in that house's first staging of Carl Orff's Die Kluge.

Huc Santana appeared as a guest artist throughout the French provinces into the mid 1960s. In 1956 he portrayed the god Jupiter in Jean-Philippe Rameau's Platée at the Aix-en-Provence Festival. He also made numerous appearances as guest artist at the Teatro Colón in Buenos Aires where he enjoyed great popularity. He was particularly admired for his portrayal of roles of Galitsky in Prince Igor, the Grand Inquisitor in Don Carlos, and the title role in Paul Dukas's Ariane et Barbe-bleue.

Huc Santana died in Paris on 21 January 1982.
