= Live at Last (Steeleye Span album) =

Live album by Steeleye Span
- Released: 1978
- Recorded: March 7, 1978
- Venue: Winter Gardens, Bournemouth
- Genre: British folk rock
- Length: 49:34
- Label: Chrysalis

Steeleye Span chronology
Storm Force Ten (1977)	Live at Last (1978)	Sails of Silver (1980)

Professional ratings
Review scores
Source	Rating
Allmusic	2/5 stars

Live at Last is a live album by the British folk rock band Steeleye Span. It is the first live album the band issued, after eight years of performing and releasing 10 studio albums. It was originally intended to be a farewell album. "This then is our eleventh and final album. Steeleye Span amicably disbanded five days after making this recording for reasons that are irrelevant here.”

It is one of only two albums the band issued on which John Kirkpatrick played (not counting a later live reunion album, The Journey), making it one of only two albums to employ an accordion as a primary instrument. The album is also notable because only two of the tracks ("Saucy Sailor/Black Freighter" and "False Knight on the Road") were songs that the band had recorded before, so that most of the material on the album is essentially new material. The band went on to release a second live version of "The Maid and the Palmer" on The Journey.

The departure of Bob Johnson and Peter Knight and their replacement by Martin Carthy and Kirkpatrick for this album (and Storm Force Ten) had taken the band away from its heavily amplified rock sound of the mid-1970s, and back to the cutting edge British folk rock approach reminiscent of the band's origins.

"The Maid and the Palmer" tells the story of a palmer (a pilgrim returning home from Jerusalem with a palm branch) who meets a woman washing clothes. He asks her for a cup of water, but she refuses. He comments that she would certainly give her lover a cup of water, and when she denies having a lover, he tells her that she is lying, and that she has borne nine children, all of whom she has killed and hidden. He condemns her to seven years as a stepping-stone, seven years as a clapper in a bell, and seven years of running as "an ape through Hell". Given the Palmer's supernatural powers, he may be Christ in disguise.

"Hunting the Wren" is a version of the Cutty Wren tradition. On Please to See the King, the band explored this tradition with "The King", and on Time, the band recorded "The Cutty Wren", another song about this tradition.

The version of “The False Knight on the Road” presented in this concert is notably different from the version recorded on Please to See the King (1971). The Live at Last version is much expanded and features the use of odd (but effective) contrasting time signatures.

== Track listing ==
All tracks are written by Traditional unless otherwise noted.

No.	Title	Writer(s)	Comments	Length
1.	"The Atholl Highlanders/Walter Bulwer's Polka"		Instrumental	5:07
2.	"Saucy Sailor/Black Freighter"	Traditional/Bertolt Brecht, Kurt Weill	Although these songs are listed as a medley, more than a second of silences passes between the fade of "Saucy Sailor" and the opening of "Black Freighter."	9:50
3.	"The Maid and the Palmer"	Traditional: Child ballad 21, Roud 91		6:37
4.	"Hunting The Wren"			3:08
5.	"Montrose"			15:16
6.	"Bonnets So Blue (*)"	Morris dance tune	(*) Original UK and 1997 CD reissue track	3:30
7.	"The False Knight on the Road"	Traditional: Child ballad 3, Roud 20	New arrangement	6:06
8.	"Rag Doll (*)"	Bob Crewe, Bob Gaudio	(*) Studio recording on the US LP release	3:03

== Personnel ==
Steeleye Span

- Maddy Prior - vocals
- Tim Hart - vocals, guitar
- Martin Carthy - vocals, guitar
- Rick Kemp - bass guitar, vocals
- John Kirkpatrick - vocals, accordion
- Nigel Pegrum - drums

Technical

- Mike Thompson - engineer
- Scott "Colac" Thompson - concert sound engineer
- Mike Thompson, Tim Hart - mixing
