= Lovely on the Water =

English folk song

"Lovely on the Water" (Roud 1539) is an English folk song. It has been collected only a handful of times from traditional singers.

One version was collected by Ralph Vaughan Williams from the singing of Mr Hilton at South Walsham, Norfolk on 11 April 1908, and published in the Journal of the Folk Song Society. Vaughan Williams' hand-written notes and transcription can be viewed via the Vaughan Williams Memorial Library online, as well as an audio rendering of the transcription.

Vaughan Williams used this Norfolk version for the first movement of his "Six Studies in English Folk Song" (1926). Vaughan Williams also used the first two verses in "The spring time of the year," the second of his Five English Folk Songs.

Steeleye Span recorded the song in 1971 using the melody and lyrics collected by Vaughan Williams, including it as the final track on their second album, Please to See the King. Since then, many other folk musicians have covered the song, including Oli Steadman on his song collection "365 Days Of Folk".
