= Saint Stephen's Day bandy =

Swedish sporting event on 26 December

Saint Stephen's Day bandy Anndandagsbandy
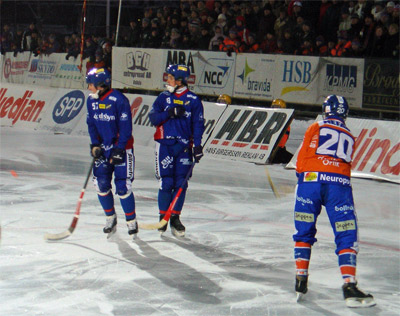
- 2004 Saint Stephen's Day game between Bollnäs GoIF and Edsbyns IF.
- Status: active
- Genre: sporting event
- Date: 26 December
- Frequency: annual
- Inaugurated: 1930's

Saint Stephen's Day bandy (Swedish: annandagsbandy) is a Swedish sporting event in which elite bandy matches are played on Saint Stephen's Day (December 26th). During the 20th century, it became a Christmas tradition in Sweden.

== History ==
The tradition dates to the 1930s, when the two clubs IF Göta and Slottsbrons IF took to playing a Saint Stephen's Day Exhibition game. Despite initial objections by the Church of Sweden to scheduling the game on the Saint Stephen's Day, the event grew in popularity thereafter.

Historically, only a few instances of the Saint Stephen's Day match marked the season opener for Elitserien, Sweden’s top division. Prior to 1957, Saint Stephen's Day was the date of the final friendly match, after which the season usually started on New Year's Day. In 1957, the top division in Sweden resumed in December, and the Saint Stephen's Day marked the first day of seasons between 1957 and 1961, (the 1962 season began on December 31). From 1963–64 onwards the season began earlier in December, and since the 1966–67 season games have started in November.

Until 1999, Saint Stephen's Day bandy was the only major sports event over Christmas in Sweden. Starting in the year 2000, its popularity led other sports to follow, such as handball and ice hockey. Now people sometimes instead talk of "Saint Stephen's Day sports" (Swedish: Annandagsidrott).
