= The Elfin Knight =

Traditional song

"The Elfin Knight" (Roud 12, Child 2) is a traditional Scottish folk ballad of which there are many versions, all dealing with supernatural occurrences, and the commission to perform impossible tasks. The ballad has been collected in different parts of England, Scotland, Ireland, the US, and Canada. As is the case with most traditional folk songs, there have been countless completely different versions recorded of the same ballad. The first broadside version was printed before 1674, and the roots of the song may be considerably older.

== Synopsis ==
In the oldest extant version of this ballad (circa 1600–1650), an elf is invoked by the wish of a young woman who hears his horn blowing, and he appears at her side and proposes tasks which the lady must perform in order to be accepted as his lover. The first verse usually opens with the introduction of the title character:

The elphin knight sits on yon hill,
Blaw, blaw, blaw, wind blaw.
He blaws his horn both lewd and shril.
The wind hath blown my plaid awa.

(Note that this verse appears to be taken directly from "Lady Isabel and the Elf-Knight", Child Ballad #4; in this ballad, the horn is magic and arouses desire in the hearer.)

Meanwhile, a maid lies in bed, wishing she could marry the knight. Upon her speaking these words, the knight appears, telling her he will marry her if she will perform numerous tasks, all impossible.

"For thou must shape a sark (Note: a shirt) to me,
Without any cut or heme," quoth he.

She promptly responds with her own list of impossible tasks.

== "The Fairy Knight" ==
Peter Buchan's Ancient Ballads and Songs of the North of Scotland volume 2 (1828) contains "The Fairy Knight", which he described as "the only complete copy of this romantic ballad that I have been able to discover". These are a selection of verses from this version:

The Elfin knight stands on yon hill,
Blaw, blaw, blaw winds, blaw!
Blawing his horn loud and shrill,
And the wind has blawin' my plaid awa'.

If I had yon horn in my kist,
Blaw, blaw, blaw winds, blaw!
And the bonny laddie here that I luve best,
And the wind has blawin' my plaid awa'.

Ye maun make me a fine Holland sark,
Blaw, blaw, blaw winds, blaw!
Without ony stitching or needle wark,
And the wind has blawin' my plaid awa'.

And ye maun wash it in yonder well,
Blaw, blaw, blaw winds, blaw!
Where the dew never wat, nor the rain ever fell,
And the wind has blawin' my plaid awa'.

Now sin' ye've ask'd some things o' me,
Blaw, blaw, blaw winds, blaw!
It's right I ask as mony o thee,
And the wind has blawin' my plaid awa'.

My father he ask'd me an acre o' land,
Blaw, blaw, blaw winds, blaw!
Between the saut sea and the strand,
And the wind has blawin' my plaid awa'.

And ye maun plow't wi' your blawing horn,
Blaw, blaw, blaw winds, blaw!
And ye maun saw't wi' pepper corn,
And the wind has blawin' my plaid awa'.

When ye've dune and finish'd your wark,
Blaw, blaw, blaw winds, blaw!
Ye'll come to me, luve, and get your sark,
And the wind has blawin' my plaid awa'.

== Commentary ==
The countering of impossible tasks with other impossible tasks is a common motif in the folktale Aarne–Thompson type 875, the Clever Girl, a fairy tale making use of this motif is The Wise Little Girl.

In Celtic folklore, in common with many other European traditions, impossible tasks are often given to a suitor as part of a wedding trial – a well known example would be Culhwch and Olwen from Welsh Brittonic tradition where the 40 impossible tasks are set by the father-in-law (in this case the giant Ysbadadden Pen Cawr).

Sexual innuendo is present throughout the ballad, with the implied solution to each impossible task for love being related to sexual reproduction. For example, a fine ("attractive") Holland ("Netherlands") sark ("covering") without stitching or needle work would be a covering made of flesh in the nether-regions. However, such subtext is not well retained throughout all variations.

== Variants, including "Scarborough Fair" ==
This ballad was one of 25 traditional works included in Ballads Weird and Wonderful which was published by John Lane's The Bodley Head in 1912 and illustrated by Vernon Hill.

The song "Scarborough Fair" is considered a relatively recent variant of "The Elfin Knight", and both are officially classified as the same ballad. Mark Anderson (1874–1953), a retired lead-miner from either Newbiggin-by-the-Sea or Middleton-in-Teesdale, County Durham, England, sang "Scarborough Fair" to Ewan MacColl in 1947. Martin Carthy learnt the song from MacColl's songbook, and included it on his eponymous debut album in 1965. He taught the song to Paul Simon the same year, and Simon & Garfunkel released their own version, which was hugely successful. Prior to this, Bob Dylan used Martin Carthy's version as the basis of his song "Girl from the North Country" from his second album The Freewheelin' Bob Dylan (1963).

A similar variant is "Whittingham Fair", a song that was popular in the north and west of Northumberland, not far from Mark Anderson's County Durham. There are also several American variants, which differ greatly, among them "My Father Had an Acre of Land", "The Parsley Vine", and "The Shirt of Lace". Several recent Scottish recordings have preserved the "blaw winds blaw" refrain from the earliest written versions of the ballad.

A novel by Nancy Werlin, Impossible (Penguin/Dial, 2008), was inspired by the song.

== Recordings ==
Following are some of the notable recordings of the ballad, including the artists, titles, albums, and years:

Artist	Title	Album	Year
Martin Carthy & Dave Swarbrick	"Scarborough Fair"	Martin Carthy	1965
Joel Frederiksen	"Whittingham Fair (The Elfin Knight)" "The Lovers' Tasks (The Elfin Knight)" "Scarborough Faire (The Elfin Knight)"	The Elfin Knight: Ballads and Dances	2007
Ewan MacColl & Peggy Seeger	"The Elfin Knight (Child #2)"	Classic Scots Ballads: Tradition Years	1959
Omnia	"The Elven Lover"	Alive!	2007
Kate Rusby	"Elfin Knight"	The Girl Who Couldn't Fly	2005
BOANN	"Elfin Knight"	Old Celtic & Nordic Ballads	2012

== See also ==
- List of the Child Ballads
- "The Fause Knight Upon the Road"
