= The Wren Song =

Traditional Irish Wren Day song

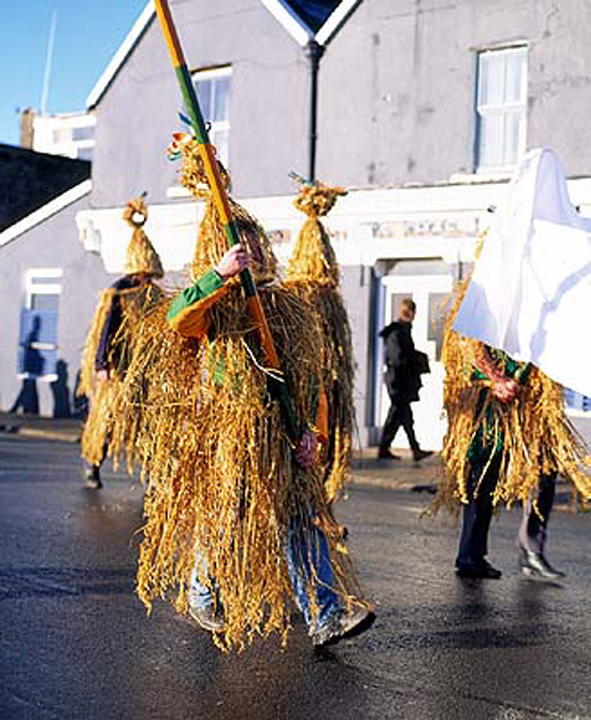
Festivities on Hunt the Wren Day

The Wren Song is sung in Ireland during Wren Day on 26 December. The song is sung by "wren boys" who raise money while parading around a town or village.

== Origin ==
The Wren Song is sung most often on Wren Day, which occurs on the day after Christmas, or 26 December. The celebration first started as an ancient pagan tradition of animal sacrifice that has been passed down though various Celtic cultures and is now celebrated across Ireland and the Isle of Man.

== Celebrations ==
On Wren Day, "Wren Boys" in Ireland meet to parade, often with a holly bush decorated with wrens, and sing the Wren Song. The boys make straw costumes to wear, and their leader's costume depicts a horse known as the hobby horse. The song is sung as the Wren Boys parade around a real or fake wren and ask for money and donations.

== Lyrics ==
There are many versions of the Wren Song, but one of the most common goes as follows:

The wren, the wren, the king of all birds
St. Stephen's Day was caught in the furze.
Although he was little, his honor was great.
Jump up me lads and give us a treat.

We followed the wren three miles or more,
three miles or more, three miles or more.
Through hedges and ditches and heaps of snow
At six o'clock in the morn.

Dreoilín, Dreoilín, where is your nest?
It's in the bush that I love best.
It's in the bush, the holly tree,
Where all the boys do follow me.

As I went out to hunt and all
I met a wren upon the wall.
Up with me wattle and gave him a fall
And brought him here to show you all.

I have a little box under me arm.
A tuppence or penny will do it no harm
For we are the boys who came your way
To bring in the wren on St. Stephen's Day.

== See also ==
- Wren Day, the celebration at which the song is sung
