= Saint Stephen's Day =

26 December in the Western church

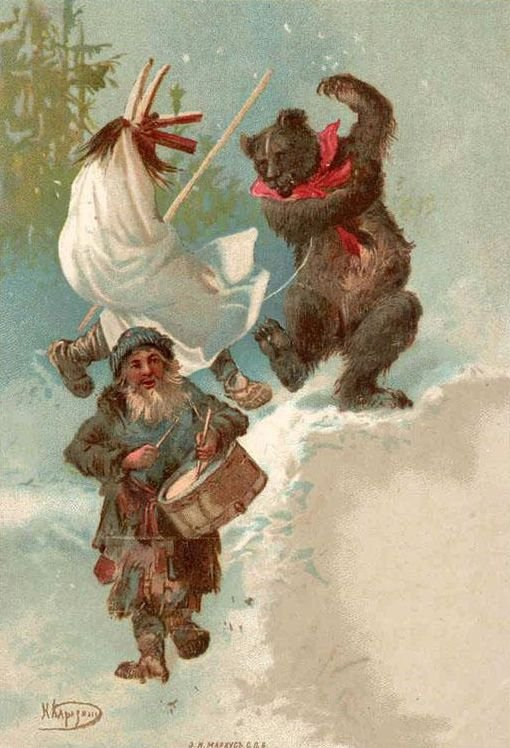
- Also called: Feast of Saint Stephen
- Observed by: Christians
- Type: Christian
- Date: 25 December (Armenia); 26 December (Western); 27 December (Eastern; Gregorian calendar); 7 January (Armenian Patriarchate of Jerusalem); 9 January (Eastern; Julian calendar)
- Duration: One day
- Frequency: Annual
- Related to: Boxing Day (concurrent), Christmastide, Wren Day

Saint Stephen's Day, also called the Feast of Saint Stephen, is a Christian saint's day to commemorate Saint Stephen, the first Christian martyr or protomartyr, celebrated on 26 December in Western Christianity and 27 December in Eastern Christianity. The Eastern Orthodox churches that adhere to the Julian calendar mark Saint Stephen's Day on 27 December according to that calendar, which places it on 9 January of the Gregorian calendar used in civil contexts. In Western Christian denominations, Saint Stephen's Day marks the second day of Christmastide.

It is an official public holiday in Alsace-Moselle, Austria, the Balearic Islands, Bosnia and Herzegovina, Catalonia, Croatia, the Czech Republic, Denmark, Estonia, Finland, Germany, Hungary, the Republic of Ireland, Italy, Luxembourg, Madeira, Montenegro, North Macedonia, Norway, Poland, Romania, Serbia, Slovakia, Slovenia, Sweden, Switzerland, Newfoundland. The date is also a public holiday in those countries that celebrate Boxing Day on the day in addition to or instead of Saint Stephen's Day, such as Australia, Canada, New Zealand, South Africa and the United Kingdom.

In the Isle of Man and in parts of Ireland, it is also known as Wren Day. It was traditional to hunt a wren, which would be paraded around the neighbourhood on top of a staff decorated with holly, ivy and ribbons.

== History ==
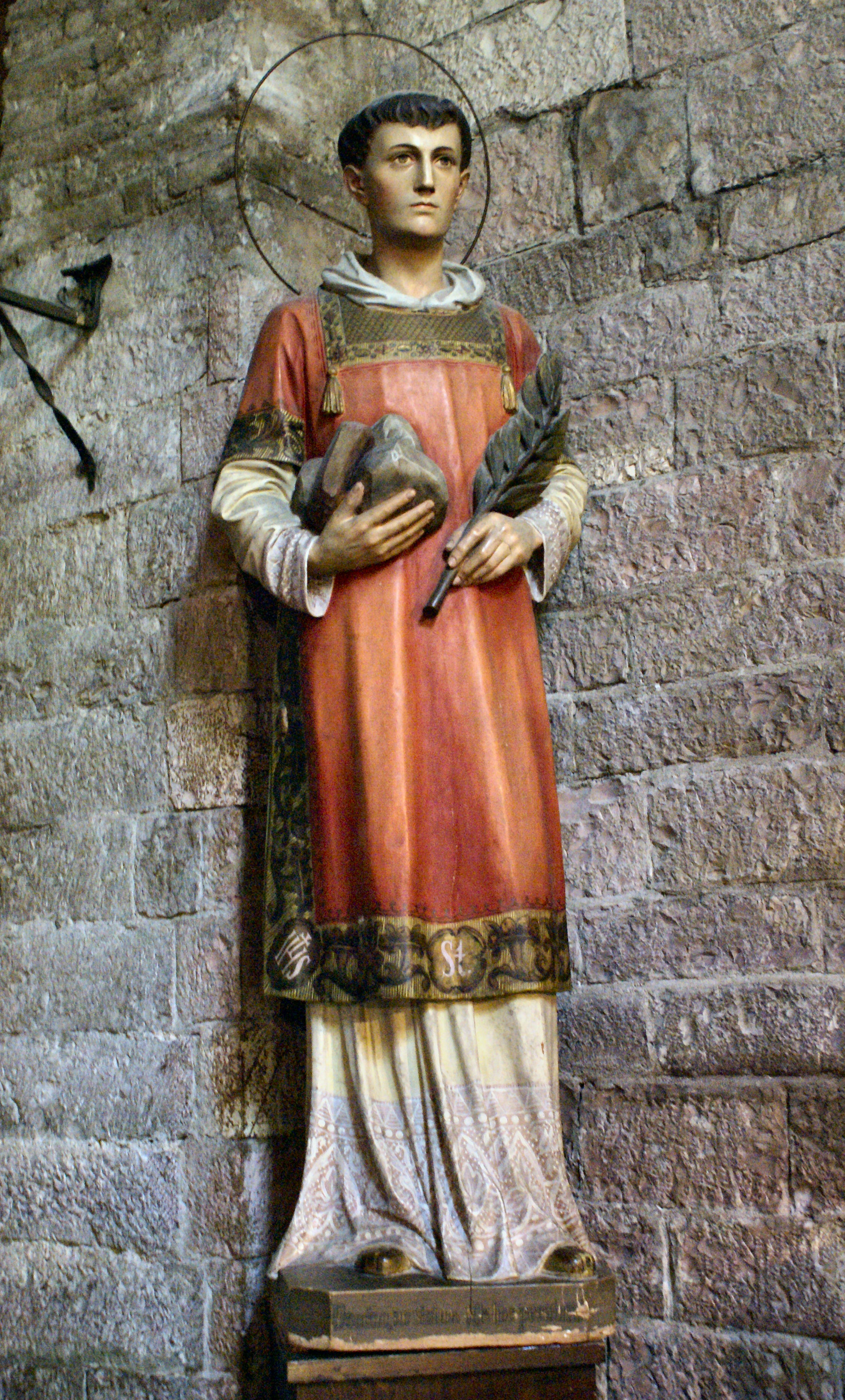
A statue of Saint Stephen stands in a Catholic church in Italy dedicated to the martyr.

Saint Stephen's Day is the second day of Christmastide and is celebrated in honour of one of the first Christian martyrs, Saint Stephen, who was stoned to death in 36 AD.

== Celebrations by country ==
=== Ireland ===
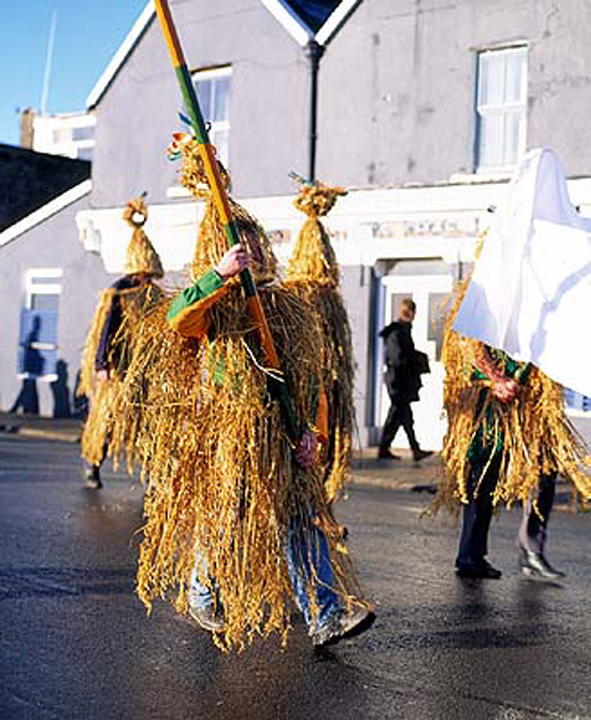
Wrenboys on Wren Day in Dingle, County Kerry, Ireland.

In the Republic of Ireland, Saint Stephen's Day (Irish: Lá Fhéile Stiofáin) is one of ten official public holidays. Its name is sometimes shortened to "Stephen's Day" (Irish: Lá 'le Stiofáin), particularly in informal contexts.

Saint Stephen's Day is also called Wren Day (Irish: Lá an Dreoilín) in parts of Ireland. Traditionally, men and boys hunted a wren and placed it on top of a staff decorated with holly, ivy and ribbons. This was paraded around the neighbourhood by a group of 'Wrenboys'—typically dressed in straw masks and costumes—who sang songs and played music in exchange for donations. Today, the wren is no longer hunted, but Wren Day has survived or been revived in a few towns, where groups of Wrenboys hold small parades and carry around a stuffed or fake wren.

It is traditional for some towns in Ireland to hold a fox hunt on St. Stephen's Day, such as Kells in County Meath.

A Mummer's Festival is held at this time every year in the village of New Inn, County Galway, and in Dingle in County Kerry. Mumming is also a big tradition in County Fermanagh. Saint Stephen's Day is a popular day for visiting family members and going to the theatre to see a pantomime.

In most of Ulster in the north of Ireland, the day is usually known as Boxing Day, especially in Northern Ireland and County Donegal.

=== Isle of Man ===
Traditionally, a wren was hunted on the Isle of Man every Saint Stephen's Day, like in Ireland. The wren's body would be hung inside a frame of holly or ivy wreaths, called the 'Wren Bush', or displayed in a small decorated wooden box with windows, called the 'Wren House'. These Wren Bushes or Wren Houses were held aloft on poles and taken around the neighbourhood by 'Wrenboys', some of whom were decked in greenery. Singing "Hunt the Wren" (Shelg yn Dreean) and beating drums, they went from house to house asking for coins. At the end of the day, a funeral was held for the wren. Today, people sing and dance around a decorated Wren Bush or Wren Pole in which a stuffed or fake wren is placed.

=== Wales ===
Saint Stephen's Day in Wales is known as Gŵyl San Steffan, celebrated every year on 26 December. One ancient Welsh custom, discontinued in the 19th century, included bleeding of livestock and "holming" by beating with holly branches of late risers and female servants. The ceremony reputedly brought good luck.

=== Catalonia, Balearic Islands (Spain) ===
Saint Stephen's Day (Sant Esteve) on 26 December is a holiday in Catalonia. It is traditionally celebrated with a festive meal that includes canelons. The pasta tubes are stuffed with ground meat that may include the leftovers of the previous day's escudella i carn d'olla, turkey, or capó. In Catalan-speaking territories the day is also known as the Second Christmas Day or the Festa Mitjana. In the Valencia area a tradition is to eat with the mother's side of the family on 25 December, and on the 26th with the father's side. Historically, the Catalan holiday on the day after Christmas may be related to the practical need for time to return home after a Christmas Day gathering and may date back to the days of the Carolingian Empire.

=== Italy ===
Christmas in Italy is one of the country's major holidays and begins on 8 December, with the Feast of the Immaculate Conception, the day on which traditionally the Christmas tree is mounted and ends on 6 January, of the following year with the Epiphany. In Italy, Saint Stephen's Day became a public holiday in 1947, where previously it was a normal working day; the Catholic Church also celebrates it as a religious holiday, even if not as a precept, as it is in Germany and other German-speaking countries. The reason for the public holiday in Italy, not required by the Catholic Church despite the fame of the saint, is to be found in the intention of prolonging the Christmas holiday, creating two consecutive public holidays, which also happens in the case of Easter Monday, a non-religious holiday, but which only wants to lengthen Easter. Before 1947 the two days were working days, with banks and offices open.

=== Alsace and Moselle ===
Saint Stephen's Day (la Saint Étienne) is marked as a public holiday as part of its shared culture across the Rhine River with Germany.

=== Austria, Germany, The Netherlands, Czech Republic, Slovakia and Poland ===
Stephanitag is a public holiday in mainly Catholic Austria. In the Archdiocese of Vienna, the day of patron saint Saint Stephen is even celebrated on the feast of the Holy Family. Similar to the adjacent regions of Bavaria, numerous ancient customs still continued to this day, such as ceremonial horseback rides and blessing of horses, or the "stoning" drinking rite celebrated by young men after attending Mass.

The 26 December is – as Second Day of Christmas (German: Zweiter Weihnachtsfeiertag, Dutch: Tweede kerstdag, Czech: druhý svátek vánoční, Polish: drugi dzień świąt) – a public holiday in Poland, Germany, The Netherlands and the Czech Republic.

=== Hungary, Székely Transylvania, Csángó land ===
On this day, the men of the villages went to the girls' houses for a Stephen's Day regélés (a custom that also appears in different versions at various times of the year). They wore sheepskin furs and used a bagpipe and a chained stick to make music. The ritual was also a fertility charm, a custom of ancient pagan origin. They told their good wishes, and sang songs to match the young, while the other boys asked for donations from the hosts and girls gave bokréta's.

=== Republika Srpska ===
Saint Stephen is also the patron saint of Republika Srpska, one of two entities of Bosnia and Herzegovina. St. Stephen's Day, 9 January, is celebrated as the Day of the Republika Srpska or Dan Republike, though mainly as an anniversary of the 1992 events rather than as a religious feast.

=== Finland ===
The best-known tradition linked to the Stephen's Day (Finnish: tapaninpäivä) is "the ride of Stephen's Day" which refers to a sleigh ride with horses. These merry rides along village streets were seen in contrast to the silent and pious mood of the preceding Christmas days.

Another old tradition was parades with singers and people dressed in Christmas suits. At some areas these parades were related to checking forthcoming brides. Stephen's Day used to be a popular day for weddings as well. These days a related tradition is dances of Stephen's Day which are held in several restaurants and dance halls.

=== Bulgaria ===
In Bulgaria, the Orthodox Church celebrates Saint Stephen's Day, also called Stefanovden (Bulgarian: Стефановден), on the third day after Christmas - 27 December. On this day, the ones who have a nameday are given gifts.

== See also ==
- Boxing Day
- Good King Wenceslas
- Saint Stephen's Day bandy
- Wren Day
