= Motley =

Traditional costume of a court jester

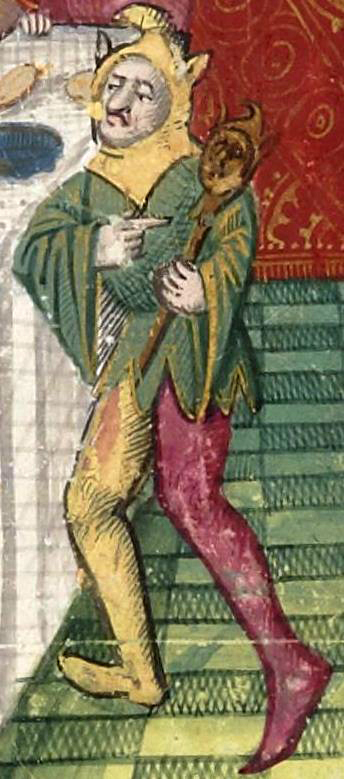
A jester dressed in motley

Motley is the traditional costume of the court jester, the motley fool. It is the costume of the arlecchino character in commedia dell'arte, the harlequin who wears a patchwork of red, green and blue diamonds. Present-day fashion occasionally adopts it as a motif.

== Cognate of medley ==
The word motley is described in the Oxford English Dictionary as a cognate of medley, although the unrelated mottled has also contributed to the meaning. The word is most commonly used as an adjective or noun, but is also seen as a verb and adverb. When used as a noun, it can mean "a varied mixture". As an adjective, it is generally disparaging: a motley collection is an uninspiring pile of stuff, as in the cliché motley crew.

== Fabric of mixed colours ==
The word originated in England between the 14th and 17th centuries and referred to a woollen fabric of mixed colours. It was the characteristic dress of the professional fool. During the Elizabethan era, motley served the important purpose of keeping the fool outside the social hierarchy and therefore not subject to class distinction. Since the fool was outside the dress laws, the fool was able to speak more freely.

Likewise, motley did not have to be checkered and has been recently thought to be one pattern with different coloured threads running through it.

Motley is the only wear.

— William Shakespeare, As You Like It, ii. 7

== See also ==
- Clown
- Harlequin
- Jester
- Shakespearean fool
- Trickster
