= The Wise Little Girl =

Russian fairy tale

The Wise Little Girl (Russian: Мудрая дева) is a Russian fairy tale collected by Alexander Afanasyev in Narodnye russkie skazki.

This type of tale is the most common European tales to deal with witty exchanges.

== Synopsis ==
Two brothers rode together, a poor one on a mare, a rich one on a stallion. The mare gave birth in the night, and the foal went under the rich brother's cart, so he claimed the cart had given birth to it. The emperor heard of their dispute at law and summoned them to ask them riddles: what were the swiftest, fattest, softest, and loveliest things in the world? The rich man went to his godmother and got answers: her husband's bay mare, a pig that they had been fattening, eiderdown, and her baby nephew. The poor man lamented his fate, and his seven-year-old daughter, his only child, heard him and gave him answers: "Tell the Emperor that the fastest thing in the world is the cold north wind in winter. The fattest is the soil in our fields whose crops give life to men and animals alike, the softest thing is a child's caress and the most precious is honesty."

The emperor gave her more difficult tasks which she was able to complete with her wisdom.
