= Straw bear =

German folklore character

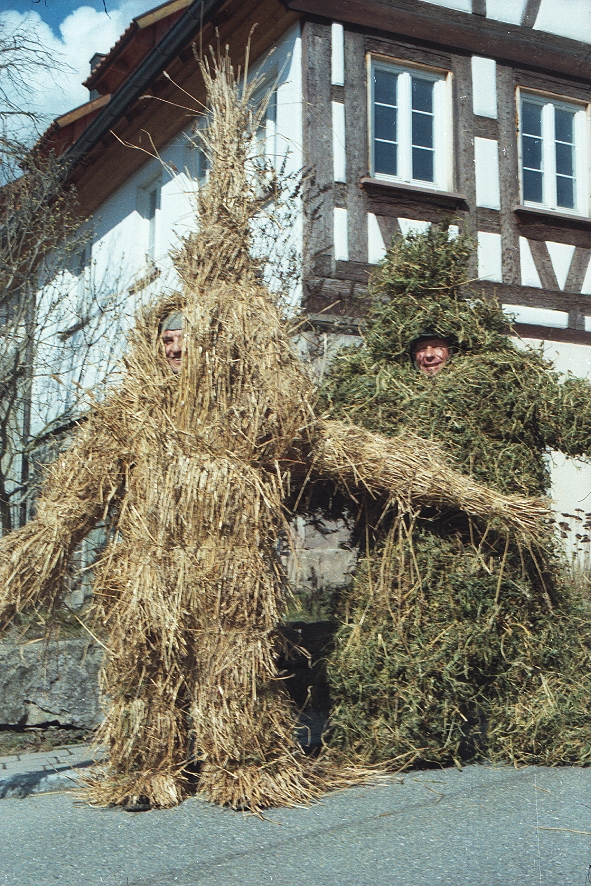
Bears of wheat- and peastraw, Empfingen, Baden-Württemberg

A straw bear (German: Strohbär, plural Strohbären) is a traditional character that appears in carnival processions or as a separate seasonal custom in parts of Germany, mainly at Shrovetide but sometimes at Candlemas or Christmas Eve.

The people playing the bears either dress in costumes made of straw, or are actually wrapped in straw. The straw used may be that of wheat, rye, oats, spelt or peastraw; twigs and modern artificial materials have also been used. The bears may be relatively realistic in appearance, with detailed masks, or fully rounded headpieces, or they may be more abstract, with narrow heads like a long, tapering sheaf.

== History ==
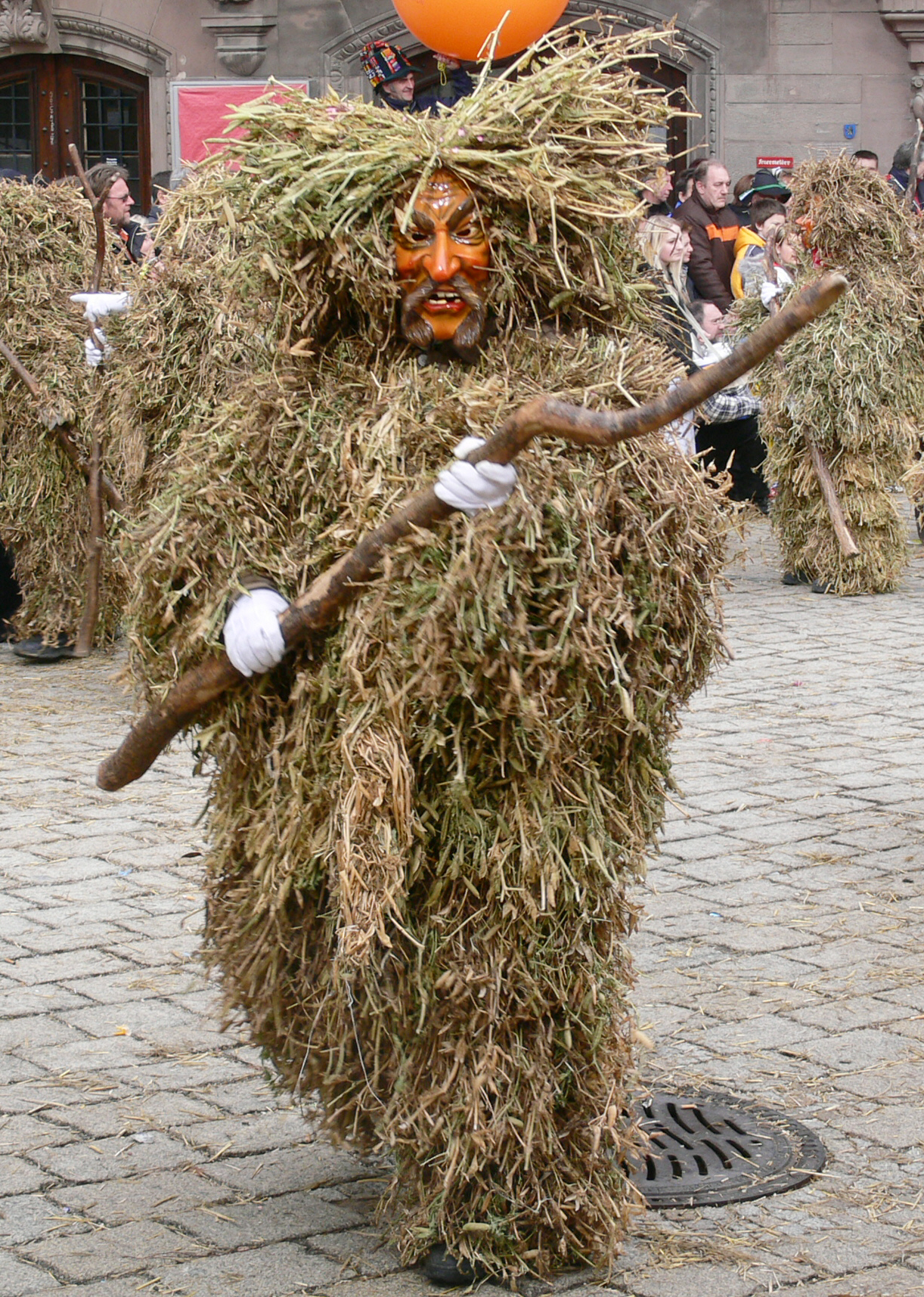
Hooriger Bär, the pea-straw-covered wild man from Singen developed from a straw bear

Straw bears may be derived from the medieval carnival figure of the Wild Man. They were also interpreted by early folklorists as personifications of Winter, and their appearance in late winter or early spring was seen as a ritual expulsion of winter from the community. Others think they were merely intended to represent the real "dancing" bears that used to be taken from place to place for entertainment.

The bears were originally accompanied by groups of costumed attendants and musicians and visited houses, begging from door to door. One of the earliest known references is from Wurmlingen in 1852. In most cases they were rewarded with gifts of eggs, lard and flour (it may have been significant that these three items were white in colour), or Fasnetsküchle (carnival fritters), or money. At the end of the day the group would share or consume their gifts in a tavern. This quête (begging) style of custom is no longer practiced; most bears now appear as part of carnival processions, although there are some which still remain independent of the carnival itself.

Straw bears appeared particularly in agricultural communities. Although the tradition is no longer as widespread as it once was, straw bears can still be found in Baden-Württemberg, Hessen (particularly the Vogelsberg), Lower Saxony, Bavaria, the Hunsrück and Eifel areas of Rhineland-Palatinate, and Thuringia.

Today they are particularly associated with the "Swabian-Alemannic Carnival" or Fastnacht of southwestern Germany in the area between the upper Neckar River and Lake Constance of Baden-Wuerttemberg. Formerly there were also straw bears in Pomerania, Rheinland and West Germany. In some places the straw-swathed characters are not intended to represent bears, and are simply known as straw men.

The decline in popularity of straw characters in carnival today is thought to be largely due to the difficulty of obtaining straw of suitable length and quality. Modern farmers generally prefer cultivars with shorter straw, or use chemical sprays to make the straw grow shorter so that their crops are less prone to damage by storms. Artificial materials have replaced straw in a few places. In other places, such as Hirschauer, where the Äschadreppler is traditionally clad in peastraw, crops are being specially planted to ensure the supply of the appropriate straw for the costumes.

Modern straw bear costumes may be kept from year to year; formerly they were often burned at the end of the day on which they were used. This still happens in some places.

== Similar customs in Germany, Austria, the Czech Republic, Nigeria, England, Ireland, and Poland ==
- Strohschab, Straw Cockroaches, appear between late November and December 5 in the "St. Nicholas Parades" in Obersdorf, Kainisch, Krungl, Bad Mitterndorf and Tauplitz, Austria.
- Shrovetide processions, Bohemia. In the town of Hlinsko, in the Czech Republic, and six nearby villages (including Hamry, Blatno, Studnice and Vortová), in the Hlinecko region of eastern Bohemia, men and boys wearing colourful costumes representing traditional characters spend a whole day going from door to door, accompanied by a brass band, visiting every household in their community. Some of the characters are Straw Men, dressed in costumes made of rice-straw, with blacked faces, and tall, pointed straw hats; they roll on the ground, and embrace women, which is said to confer fertility. Housewives gather straw from the Straw Men's skirts and take it home to feed their poultry. A ritual dance is performed in front of each house, to ensure wealth for the family and a good harvest. At the end of the day the men perform a ritual called "Killing the Mare"; the Mare, one of the group's hobby horses, is "killed" for its alleged sins. It is then "brought back to life" (with alcohol) and a dance ensues, involving the onlookers. This custom has survived despite being banned in the 18th and 19th centuries by the Catholic Church and in the 20th by the Socialist government. It has now been recognised by UNESCO as an element of mankind's Intangible Cultural Heritage.

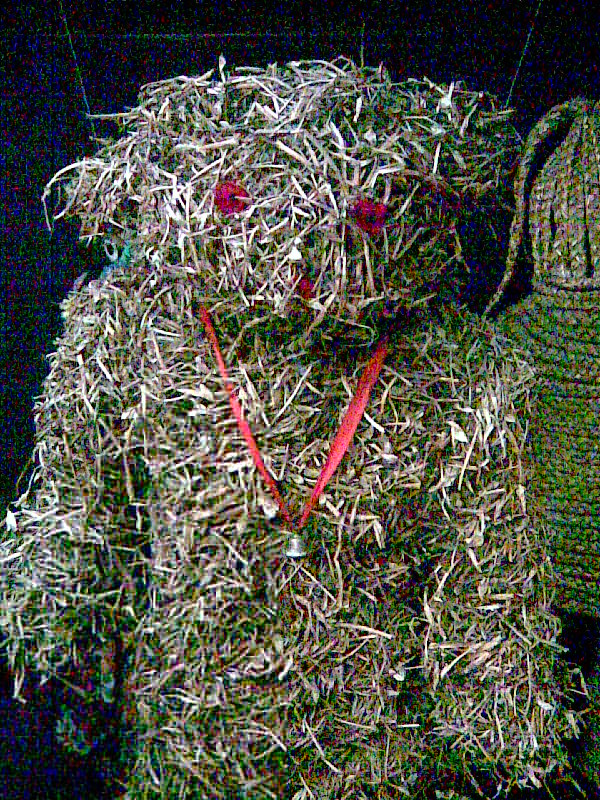
Polish Shrovetide Straw Bear in Warsaw Ethnographic Museum

- Niedźwiedź zapustny, Poland. Shrovetide straw bears were also known in Poland.
- Nigeria: In the southern parts of Nigeria, various masquerades appear with straw-made attires. These attires differ in appearance, color and fullness.
- Whittlesea, England Straw Bears are paraded from house to house asking for food or drink every Plough Monday, often accompanied by Molly Dance.
- Ireland, Strawboys can be seen on Wren Day as part of mummers' play traditions.

=== Examples from The Golden Bough ===
- In The Golden Bough, Sir James Frazer described many examples of straw effigies being made in late winter or early spring, mainly during Lent, to represent Carnival, or Death, or Winter, which were dressed up and paraded before being burned or destroyed by other means. Most of his examples are inanimate, but a few involve people dressed in straw.
  - In the Ore Mountains the following custom was annually observed at Shrovetide about the beginning of the seventeenth century. Two men disguised as Wild Men, the one in brushwood and moss, the other in straw, were led about the streets, and at last taken to the market-place, where they were chased up and down, shot and stabbed. Before falling they reeled about with strange gestures and spirted blood on the people from bladders which they carried. When they were down, the huntsmen placed them on boards and carried them to the ale-house, the miners marching beside them and winding blasts on their mining tools as if they had taken a noble head of game. A very similar Shrovetide custom is still observed near Schluckenau in Bohemia. A man dressed up as a Wild Man is chased through several streets till he comes to a narrow lane across which a cord is stretched. He stumbles over the cord and, falling to the ground, is overtaken and caught by his pursuers. The executioner runs up and stabs with his sword a bladder filled with blood which the Wild Man wears round his body; so the Wild Man dies, while a stream of blood reddens the ground. Next day a straw-man, made up to look like the Wild Man, is placed on a litter, and, accompanied by a great crowd, is taken to a pool into which it is thrown by the executioner. The ceremony is called “burying the Carnival.”
  - …in the region of the middle Rhine, a representative of Summer clad in ivy combats a representative of Winter clad in straw or moss and finally gains a victory over him. The vanquished foe is thrown to the ground and stripped of his casing of straw, which is torn to pieces and scattered about, while the youthful comrades of the two champions sing a song to commemorate the defeat of Winter by Summer.
  - At Goepfritz in Lower Austria, two men personating Summer and Winter used to go from house to house on Shrove Tuesday, and were everywhere welcomed by the children with great delight. The representative of Summer was clad in white and bore a sickle; his comrade, who played the part of Winter, had a fur-cap on his head, his arms and legs were swathed in straw, and he carried a flail. In every house they sang verses alternately.
  - In the district of Aachen on Ash Wednesday, a man used to be encased in peas-straw and taken to an appointed place. Here he slipped quietly out of his straw casing, which was then burned, the children thinking that it was the man who was being burned.
