= Hobby horse =

Costumed character

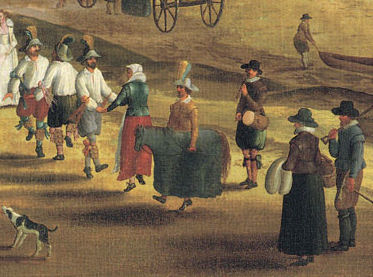
Painting of a hobby horse with Morris dancers beside the River Thames at Richmond, London; detail of Thames at Richmond, with the Old Royal Palace, c. 1620 (Fitzwilliam Museum, unknown artist)

In folklore, a hobby horse is a costumed character representing a horse found in seasonal customs, processions and similar folk observances.

In England, they are particularly associated with May Day celebrations, mummers' plays and the Morris dance.

== Etymology ==
The word hobby is glossed by the OED as "a small or middle-sized horse; an ambling or pacing horse; a pony". The word is attested in English from the 14th century, as Middle English hobyn. Old French had hobin or haubby, whence Modern French aubin and Italian ubino. But the Old French term is apparently adopted from English rather than vice versa. OED connects it to "the by-name Hobin, Hobby", a variant of Robin" (compare the abbreviation Hob for Robert). This appears to have been a name customarily given to a cart-horse, as attested by White Kennett in his Parochial Antiquities (1695), who stated that "Our ploughmen to some one of their cart-horses generally give the name of Hobin, the very word which Philippe de Commines uses, Hist. VI. vii." Another familiar form of the same Christian name, Dobbin, has also become a generic name for a cart-horse.

== Types of hobby horse ==
Hobby horses may be constructed in several different ways. The types most frequently found in the United Kingdom have been categorised as follows:

- Tourney horses are meant to look like a person riding a small horse that is wearing a long cloth coat or caparison (as seen in medieval illustrations of jousting knights at a tourney or tournament). A circular or oval frame is suspended around their waist, or chest, with a skirt draped over it hanging down to the ground. The frame has a carved wooden head, often with snapping jaws (operated by pulling a string) attached to it at one end, and a tail at the other. The "rider" may wear a cape or other flowing costume to help cover the frame. In the most elaborate versions, fake legs, meant to be those of the rider, hang down the sides of the skirt, though this seems to be a fairly recent development.
- Sieve horses are a simpler version of the tourney horse. Known only in Lincolnshire, they are made from a farm sieve frame, with head and tail attached, suspended from the performer's shoulders. The performer wears a horse blanket (the kind that includes a headpiece with holes for the eyes and ears) that covers them and the sieve.
- Mast horses are meant to represent the horse (or other animal) itself. They have a head made of wood, or sometimes an actual horse's skull is used; it usually has hinged jaws that can be made to snap. The head is attached to a stick about 1 m (3 ft) long. The person acting the creature is covered by a cloth attached to the back of its head; he (or, rarely, she) bends over forwards or crouches, holding the head in front of their own and resting the other end of the stick on the ground. A tail may be attached to the back of the cloth. When the cloth is long enough, such as the sheet used by the Welsh Mari Lwyd, the performer can also stand up, lifting the head in front of their face or above their head.

Not all hobby horses fit into these categories, even within the UK. The famous May Day horses at Padstow and Minehead are large constructions, suspended at shoulder level, with only the performer's head emerging; they wear tall, pointed hats and their faces are masked. The Padstow horses have circular frames, with fairly small, snapping-jawed heads on long, straight necks; the Minehead horses are more boat-shaped, with pointed ends and, since about 1880, have had no heads, though they have long, trailing tails, about 2.2 m (7 ft) long.

In the South of France, in Belgium (the Ommegang de Termonde) and elsewhere, large hobby horses are carried by multiple performers; their hollow frameworks are constructed in various ways. The Danse du Baiar at Esquièze the dancers wear a wooden horse head in their breasts when dancing.

In Indonesia, flat silhouettes of horses are suspended between the dancers' legs (see individual entries, below).

== Customs ==
=== Britain ===
==== May Day hobby horses ====
===== Padstow =====
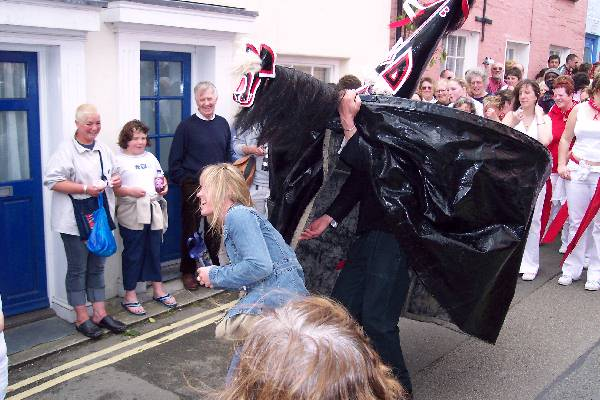
The Old 'Oss capturing a young woman during the May Day festival at Padstow, Cornwall

The most famous traditional British hobby horses are probably those of the May Day 'Obby 'Oss festival in Padstow, Cornwall. They are made from a circular framework, tightly covered with shiny black material, carried on the shoulders of a dancer whose face is hidden by a grotesque mask attached to a tall, pointed hat. A skirt (made from the same material) hangs down from the edge of the frame to around knee-height. There is a small, wooden, horse's head with snapping jaws, attached to a long, straight neck, with a long mane, which sticks out from the front of the frame. On the opposite side there is a small tail of horsehair.

There are two rival horses and their bands of supporters at Padstow: the Old 'Oss is decorated with white and red, and its supporters wear red scarves to show their allegiance; the Blue Ribbon 'Oss (or "Peace 'Oss") is decorated with white and blue and its supporters follow suit. A "Teaser" waving a padded club dances in front of each 'Oss, accompanied, as they dance through the narrow streets, by a lively band of melodeons, accordions and drums playing Padstow's traditional May Song. The 'Osses sometimes capture young women beneath the skirt of the hobby horse; often they emerge smeared with black.

Children sometimes make "Colt" 'Osses and hold their own May Day parades.

===== Minehead =====
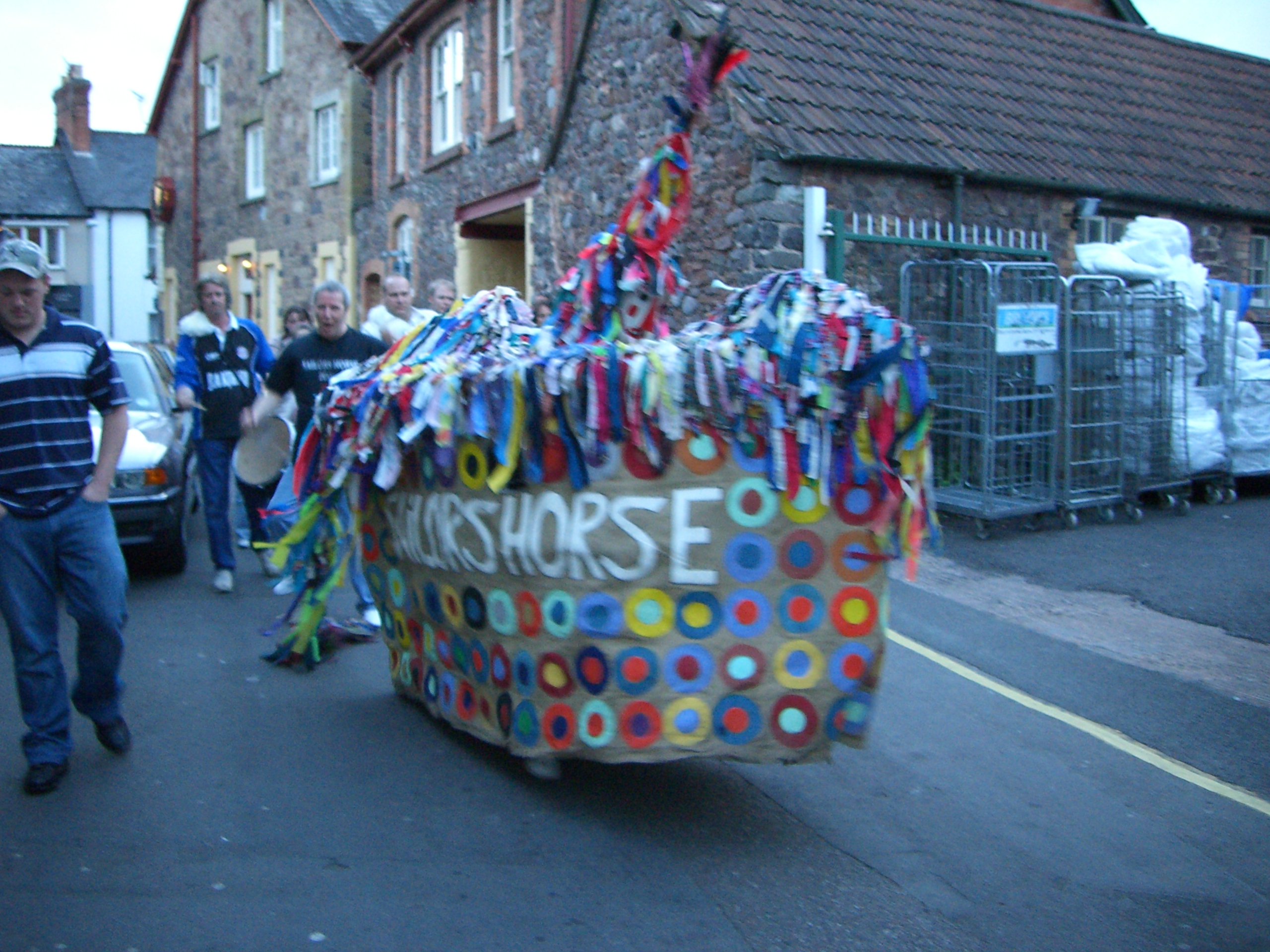
Minehead Hobby Horse

At Minehead in Somerset there are three rival hobby horses, the Original Sailor's Horse, the Traditional Sailor's Horse and the Town Horse. They appear on May Eve (called "Show Night"), on May Day morning (when they salute the sunrise at a crossroads on the outskirts of town), 2 May and 3 May (when a ceremony called "The Bootie" takes place in the evening at part of town called Cher) New Page 1. Each horse is made of a boat-shaped wooden frame, pointed and built up at each end, which is carried on the dancer's shoulders. As at Padstow, his face is hidden by a mask attached to a tall, pointed hat. The top surface of the horse is covered with ribbons and strips of fabric. A long fabric skirt, painted with rows of multicoloured roundels, hangs down to the ground all round. A long tail is attached to the back of the frame. Each horse is accompanied by a small group of musicians and attendants. The Town Horse is accompanied by "Gullivers", dressed similarly to the horse but without the large frame; as at Padstow, smaller, children's horses have sometimes been constructed . The horses' visits are (or were) believed to bring good luck.

In the past there was also a similar hobby horse based at the nearby village of Dunster, which would sometimes visit Minehead Obby Oss. The Minehead horse has also visited Dunster Castle on May Day.

==== Hunting the Earl of Rone ====
At Combe Martin in Devon a custom called "The Hunting of the Earl of Rone" took place on Ascension Day until 1837, when it was banned. It was revived in 1974 and now takes place over the four days of Spring Bank Holiday. A fool and a hobby horse, accompanied by grenadiers, search the village for the Earl, who is finally captured, mounted onto a (real) donkey and paraded through the village. He is frequently shot at by the soldiers, falls from his mount, and is revived by the hobby horse and the fool, and returned to his mount. Finally, on reaching the beach, the Earl is executed and thrown into the sea.

==== Morris and other ritual dance ====
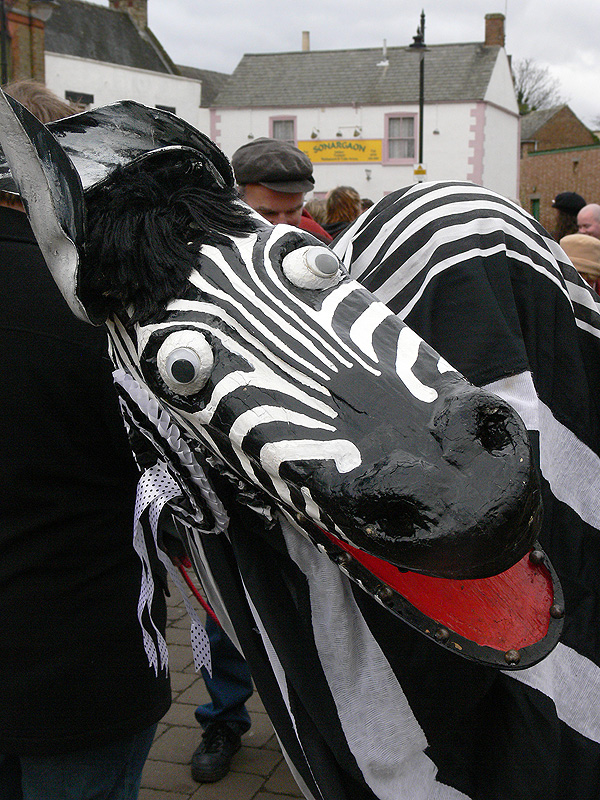
Some modern dance sides have reinterpreted the hobby horse: this hooden horse is a zebra

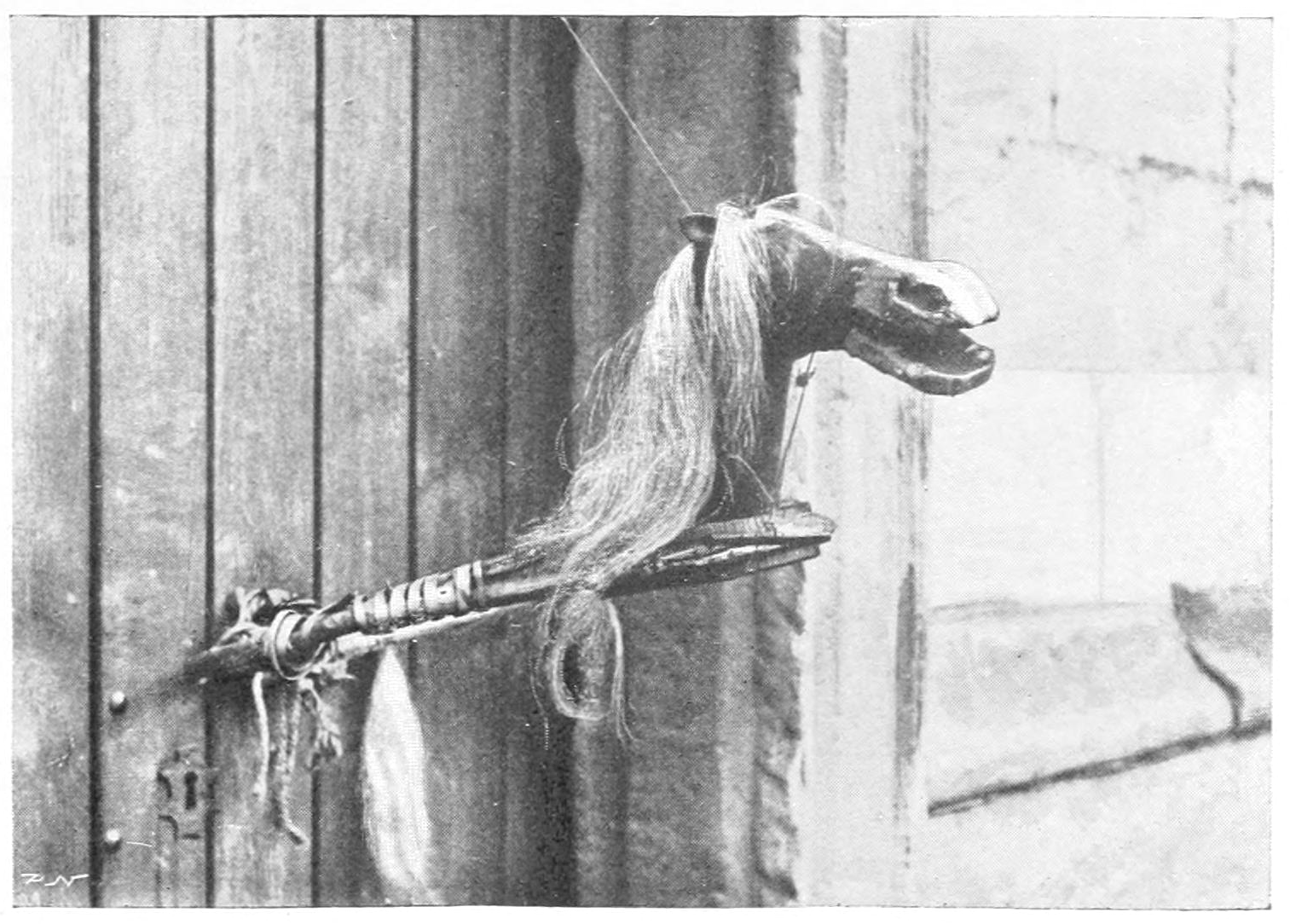
The Abbots Bromley hobby horse "undressed" (from Folk-Lore, 1896)

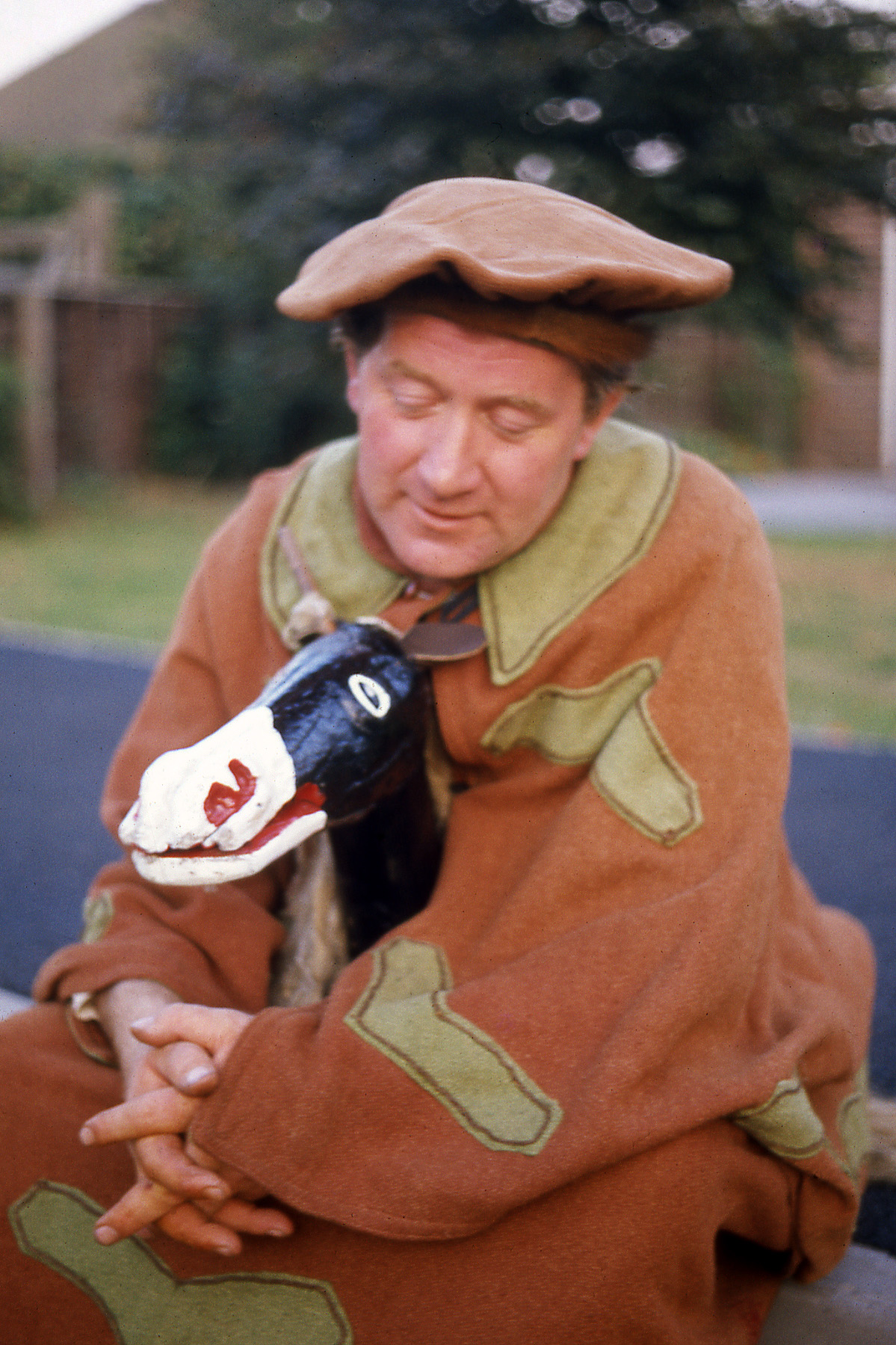
The Abbots Bromley hobby horse in costume, c.1976

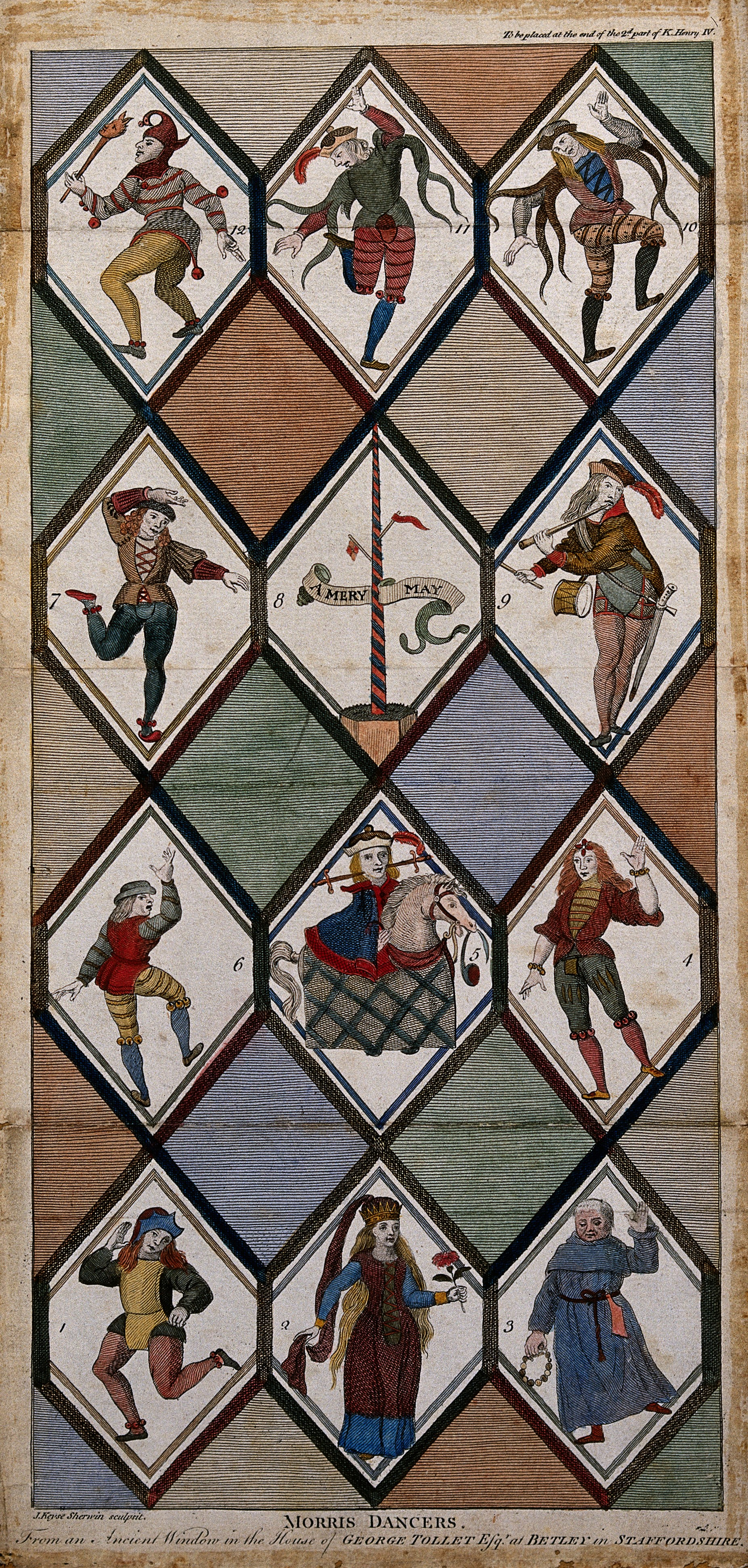
The Betley stained-glass window, depicting morris dancers and a hobby horse

In the sixteenth and seventeenth centuries there is evidence of an association between morris dancing and hobby horses. A hobby horse is depicted in a stained-glass window, dating from between 1550 and 1621, from Betley Hall, Staffordshire, now in the Victoria and Albert Museum, London, directly below a maypole and surrounded by what appear to be morris dancers (accession no. C.248-1976).

A painting from c.1620, by an unknown artist, now in the Fitzwilliam Museum, Cambridge, shows Morris dancers by the Thames at Richmond; their party includes a hobby horse.

The 1621 play The Witch of Edmonton, by William Rowley, Thomas Dekker and John Ford, features a group of Morris dancers with a hobby horse.

Several morris teams formed or revived from the late nineteenth century onwards have incorporated a hobby-horse into their side, though there is no evidence that this is a continuation of the historic association which largely ceased in the seventeenth century. Early revival teams such as those from Bidford-upon-Avon and Ilmington incorporated a hobby-horse despite the lack of evidence of the morris tradition there including one. Some modern revival sides have extended their animal repertoire in various imaginative and appropriate ways, e.g. Pig Dyke Molly molly dancers, who wear black and white costumes and makeup, have a hobby zebra.

The Abbots Bromley Horn Dance, once a Christmastime custom but by the late nineteenth century performed in September, features a tourney-style hobby horse. The horn dance seems to have begun as a hobby horse custom but has developed over time to emphasise the horn dance aspect – the first known mention of a hobby horse at Abbots Bromley predates the first record of the horns by 150 years, and the earliest source to mention the horns describes the custom as a hobby horse dance.

==== Other customs including hobby horses ====
===== Hodening or Hoodening =====
A custom which took place at, or in the lead-up to, Christmas in eastern Kent, involving a group of ploughmen or other farmworkers leading a Hooden Horse (a horse's head made of wood, set on a short pole, with snapping jaws (sometimes set with nails for teeth) operated by a person hidden under a piece of sacking or a stable-blanket to represent the animal's body). The custom, described as "only just extinct" by folklorist Violet Alford in 1952, has since been revived in various places.

===== Laair Vane =====
A Christmas and New Year custom from the Isle of Man, involving a white-painted wooden horse's head with red-painted snapping jaws, with a white sheet attached. Draped in the sheet, a man would carry the head, racing unexpectedly into the room and chase any girls present out of the house, followed by the rest of the company. When the Laair Vane (white mare) caught a girl she would take his place under the sheet to carry the horse back into the house, sitting away from the others while a kind of sword-dance was performed with sticks by six male dancers to the tune "Mylecharane's March" played on the fiddle. As the climax of the dance the fiddler would enter the circle of dancers and be imprisoned by their intertwined sticks; the dancers then, with wild cries, "cut off his head" and he fell to the ground. The "dead" fiddler was then blindfolded and led to the Laair Vane, and knelt with his head in her lap. Another person would question the fiddler about events in the coming year (particularly who would become Valentines) and his replies were believed to be true predictions.

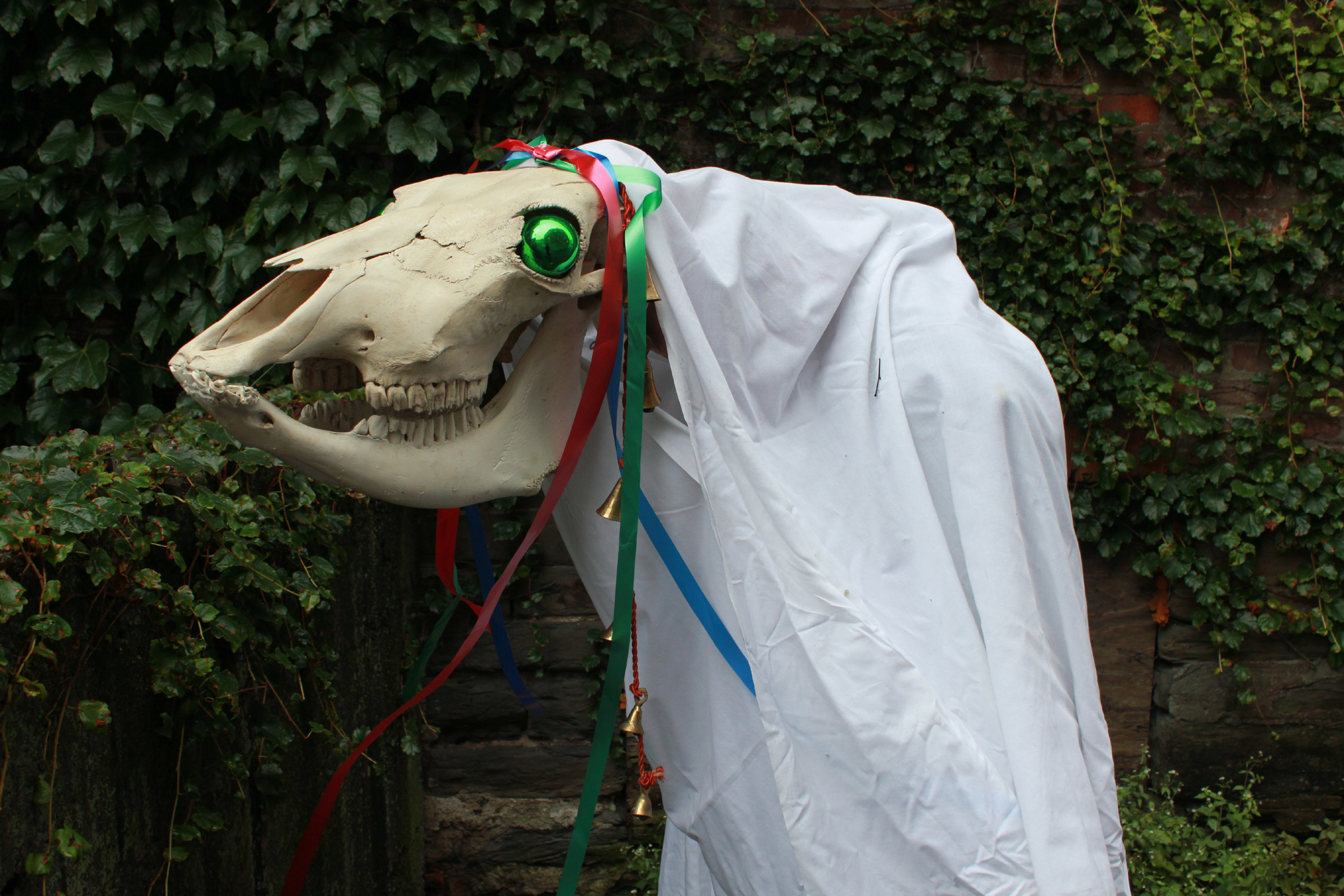
A Welsh Mari Lwyd with Christmas tree baubles for eyes

===== Mari Lwyd =====
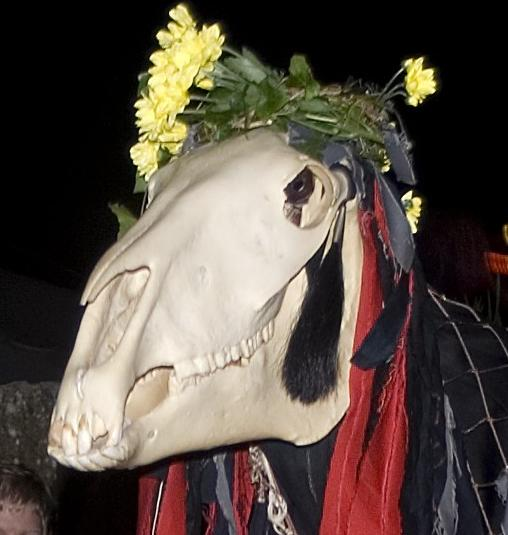
The modern Cornish Penglaz

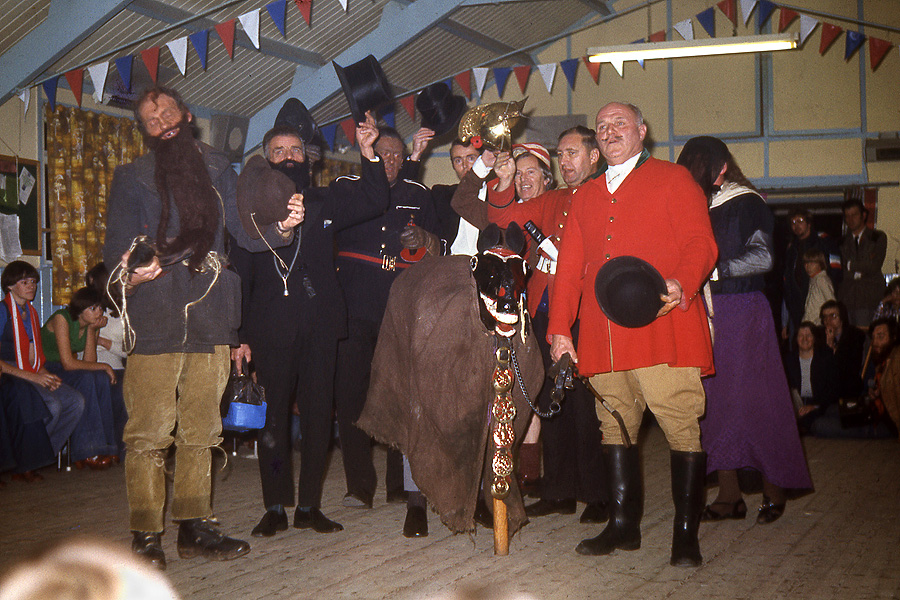
The Antrobus Soul-cakers with Dick, the Wild Horse (mid 1970s)

A similar creature, the Mari Lwyd ("Grey Mare" in English), also made from a horse's skull, with a white sheet attached, took part in New Year house-visiting, luck-bringing rituals in south-east Wales. Gaining access to the house was a challenge; the Mari Lwyd party and those in the house took turns to improvise verses of a song. If the household failed to come up with a final verse the Mari was allowed to enter; if not, it was turned away. The custom has been revived in recent years.

===== Old Horse, 'Owd 'Oss or Poor Old Hoss =====
In parts of Nottinghamshire, Derbyshire and around Sheffield there existed, into the early 20th century (and until 1970 at Dore) a Christmas and New Year custom of going from house to house performing a short play or dramatised song called The Old Horse, T'Owd 'Oss or Poor Old Horse. The Old Horse was of the "mast" type, constructed in a similar way to the Wild Horse of the Soul-cakers and the hooden horses of Kent. The earliest record is from 1840, at Ashford-in-the-Water, Derbyshire.

This type of performance still continues at Richmond, Yorkshire, at Christmas. Three men dressed in hunting pink lead a horse "made from the stuffed skin of a horse's head on a pole" and the man who plays it hidden under a horse-blanket. The men sing the Poor Old Horse song and the horse snapped its jaws at the end of each verse. The custom as now performed in Richmond Market Place around midday on Christmas Eve involves the horse's "death and resurrection" (he crouches down and then rises up when a hunting horn is blown).

===== Penzance =====
In the nineteenth century, Richard Edmonds described the hobby-horse which accompanied Christmas Guisers in Penzance, Cornwall. According to Edmonds, it had a wooden head with a snapping jaw, and the operator was covered with a horse's hide or horse cloth. According to B. C. Spooner in 1958, the hobby horse used a horse's skull, and was called pen-glas, meaning "grey head" in Cornish. The animal has been revived in Penzance in recent years as Penglaz the Penzance 'Obby 'Oss and now appears on "Mazey Eve" and 23 June (St John's Eve) as part of a modern Midsummer festival, instead of around midwinter.

===== Plough Monday mummers =====
In Lincolnshire and Nottinghamshire and some other parts of the East Midlands of England, mummers' plays were performed, on or around Plough Monday in early January, by teams known variously as Plough Stots, Plough Jags, Plough Jacks, Plough Bullocks or Plough Witches. In North Lincolnshire, large teams of elaborately costumed mummers, often having some of the characters duplicated, paraded through the village streets, sometimes splitting up into smaller groups to enter houses and perform extracts from their traditional play. Photographs of teams from Scunthorpe, Burringham, Scotter, Burton-upon-Stather and elsewhere showed double gangs with two hobby horses. They were of the sieve type, made by hanging the wooden frame of a large sieve, with a small wooden horse's head and horsehair tail attached, around the performer's waist, However, in an unusual variation, the "rider" was then disguised by wearing a horse-cloth which covered his head and body to the knees, so that he appeared to be a horse riding a horse.

===== Salisbury Giant and Hob-Nob =====
The Salisbury Giant, a 12 ft-tall (3.5m) figure sometimes said to represent Saint Christopher, is a processional figure unique in Britain. The current figure's wooden frame was rebuilt c. 1850 although it is probable that he existed in the 15th century. It rarely appears nowadays, being kept in the Salisbury and South Wiltshire Museum, along with its companion Hob-Nob, a tourney-type hobby horse, a mischievous character which used to clear the way for the Giant in the processions that were held by the Tailor's Guild on Midsummer's Eve. Hob-Nob's rider's face and body were disguised with a substantial veil. The first clear mention of the hobby horse is in 1572 (along with a "mayde Marrians Coate") in the records of the Tailors' Guild (who, in 1873, finally sold both hobby-horse and Giant to the Museum). The processions, which also involved morris dancers until around 1911, continued sporadically on various occasions into the mid 20th century.

===== Soul-caking or Souling =====
Some regional variants of the mummers play, performed around All Souls' Day in Cheshire, included a non-speaking character called the "Wild Horse", made from a horse's skull mounted on a short pole. The horse was played by a man, hidden under a cloth attached to the pole, who bent forward to rest the pole on the ground. He could usually snap the horse's jaws loudly to frighten onlookers.

===== Winster Hobby Horses =====
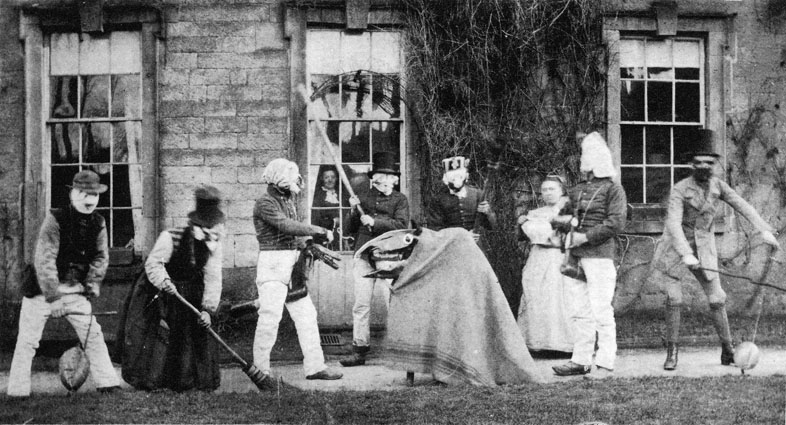
The three Winster hobby horses and other performers, c. 1870

A possibly unique custom involving three hobby horses is known only from a photograph taken at Winster Hall, Derbyshire, in about 1870. (The picture appears to have been taken in winter, as the climbing plants on the wall are leafless.) Eight or nine performers are involved; all (bar one?) have facial disguise.

The performers are grouped around a mast horse (possibly 'Snap Dragon'; see below) with a shiny black head made from a painted skull set on a short pole. Behind it are two men in threatening postures, one is waving a long stick like the handle of a brush or rake, the other probably a besom broom (blurred).

Two more men wearing military-looking jackets, buttoned to the neck, and white trousers stand astride small hobbyhorses of an apparently unique design: a cylindrical body, "about three inches diameter and two feet long", held between the rider's legs (supported at the front by a cord or narrow strap around the rider's neck), with a flat, curved wooden neck and a small, stylised head with snapping jaws (apart from their mouths, the horses look almost like simple rocking horses with the legs removed). The horsemen are masked in light-coloured cloth.

Another character wears a rather voluminous, tattered, long, dark dress; busily brushing the ground with a besom broom, "she" is reminiscent of the character Besom Bet who appears in some mummers plays. The last two characters are playing rough music on bladder fiddles.

The performance may have been arranged by Llewellynn Jewitt, who lived at the hall between 1868 and 1880. In 1931, Stanley Evans ("Folk Dancing in Derbyshire", Derbyshire Countryside, vol 1, no. 2, April 1931, p. 29) suggested the performers may have been performing a mumming play. E. C. Cawte dismissed this suggestion: "if so it is a most unusual one, there is no sign of the combatants, the pair of horses is of an unusual design, and the mast horse seems to be the centre of attention."

In his field notes, made in 1908, folklorist Cecil Sharp referred to a hobby horse "without a curtain" being connected with the morris dance at Winster; he also mentions a "Snap Dragon" made from "a real horse's head" (skull?) dug up for the purpose, but does not say whether it was associated with the morris. It seems he did not see them himself and his account published in 1924, long after his visit to Winster, is confusing. In 1966, Winster morris dancers stated that there had never been a hobby horse associated with their morris, but that there had been a separate horse ceremony involving a skull that was reburied each year.

In notes published after his death, Llewellynn Jewitt noted how, in 1867, a dozen or so groups of traditional performers (several groups of guisers, the Wensley mummers, 'The Hobby Horse' and the 'Snap Dragon') called at Winster Hall in just four days between Christmas and New Year. He noted that, on 27 December, "In the evening the Winster 'Snap Dragon' and 'Hobby Horse' conjoined came to us — ten men, one as Snap Dragon, two with Hobby Horses, two devils, etc., etc. We had them in the kitchen and gave them money." The photograph may well show one such "conjoined" team.

==== Related customs ====
Similar customs include The Broad in the Cotswolds and Old Ball in the Forest of Rossendale in Lancashire.

===== Derby Tup =====
The Old Tup or Derby Tup was constructed in a similar way to the hooden horse, but with a sheep's rather than horse's head. This was usually a wooden head, sometimes with real sheep's horns or sheepskin attached, but some sources record a real sheep's skull or even an entire preserved sheep's head being used. It took part in a dramatised version of the Derby Ram folksong, which was performed in northern Derbyshire and around Sheffield during the Christmas season by teams of boys. It is "killed" by a butcher and its "blood" is collected in a large bowl. In some versions it is brought back to life by a quack doctor, like a character in the Mummers play.

=== Europe ===
==== Austria ====
===== Sankt Lorenzen im Lesachtal, Carinthia =====
The Fasnacht (carnival) procession in Sankt Lorenzen im Lesachtal, south-west Austria, features a large band of musicians, some in fancy dress, and is led by a large, rather frisky hobby horse. It has a hollow body, covered by a long white sheet that almost reaches the ground, with a long neck and head apparently made of cardboard or papier-mâché; it is carried by two people who are hidden beneath the sheet. The horse has a few coloured ribbons attached to its mane, bridle and tail. Its reins are held by a man dressed in a red jacket, and it is closely followed by a boy (who occasionally prods it with a wooden hay-fork) and a blacksmith in an apron (who carries a bag containing a hammer). Other stock characters in the parade include four masked, smartly dressed "old men" with walking sticks. From time to time the horse falls to the ground and is then "shod" (the smith hammers the shoe soles of one or other of the carriers, who kick out, wildly). The man who leads it sometimes breathes into its mouth or nostrils. It then revives and continues through the village.

At Ezpeize the formal dancing is suddenly interrupted by a wild invasion. An unruly gang of rustically dressed characters, wearing masks or facial disguise, rushes into the dancing area in pairs, with loud cries. Some wave clubs. Some have furry tails. There is a doctor and a nurse, in white coats with a red cross on the back. They all race around the dancing space in an anti-clockwise direction and then fall to the ground in a writhing heap.

==== Belgium ====
===== Lumeçon, Ducasse de Mons =====
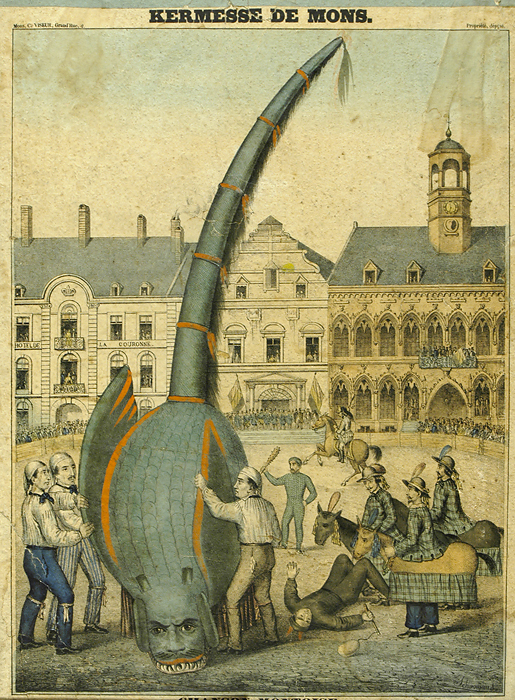
A 19th century illustration of the Mons dragon with hobby horses

Also known as the "Doudou", the Ducasse de Mons is a festival that takes place on Trinity Sunday in the town of Mons and consists of two parts. The first is a procession with the shrine of Saint Waltrude. The second part, called the Lumeçon, depicts the combat of St George and the Dragon and features a large processional dragon with an enormously long, stiff tail. Saint George's attempts to kill the dragon with his lance all fail, so he then dispatches it with a pistol. An illustration from the 19th century clearly shows the dragon with three hobby-horses of the "tourney" type, but modern photographs and descriptions of the event show these animals are made of cow-hide and look more like dogs; they are known as Chinchins or Chins-Chins (a corruption of chien, dog) and their role is to aid St. George.

The festival has been recognised by UNESCO since 2005 as one of the Masterpieces of the Oral and Intangible Heritage of Humanity under the general heading of "Processional Giants and Dragons in Belgium and France".

==== Czech Republic ====
===== Killing the Mare, Shrovetide =====
The finale to the Shrovetide processions in the town of Hlinsko, in the Czech Republic, and six nearby villages (including Hamry, Blatno, Studnice and Vortová), in the Hlinecko region of eastern Bohemia, is a ritual called "Killing the Mare".

Accompanied by a brass band, men and boys wearing colourful costumes representing traditional characters spend a whole day going from door to door, visiting every household in their community (except those known to be in mourning). Details differ slightly from place to place, but there are usually two or three hobby-horses (of the tourney type). Other characters include the Straw Men, dressed in costumes made of rice-straw, with blacked faces, and tall, pointed straw hats; they embrace women and roll with them on the ground, which is said to confer fertility. Housewives gather straw from the Straw Men's skirts as a good luck charm, taking it home to feed their geese and chickens.

With the "Little Wife" (a man dressed as a woman) and the "dotted man", four dancers representing Turks perform a ritual dance in front of each house, to ensure wealth for the family and a good harvest. They must lift their legs as high as possible to ensure tall crops of flax. They wave handkerchieves, as in the English morris dance but originally wielded sabres instead.

At the end of the day the men perform a ritual called "Killing the Mare". One of the group's hobby horses, is judged and then "killed" for its alleged sins. It is then "brought back to life" (with alcohol) and a dance ensues, involving the onlookers. This custom has survived despite being banned in the 18th and 19th centuries by the Catholic Church and in the 20th by the Socialist government. It has now been recognised by UNESCO as an element of mankind's Intangible Cultural Heritage.

==== France ====
Several hobby-horse customs exist in the Languedoc area of southwest France, which is a stronghold for "totem" animals, with many towns and villages having their own particular creature; most appear at carnival time and/or their local patronal festivals, saint's days and other festivities.

===== Le Poulain de Pézenas =====
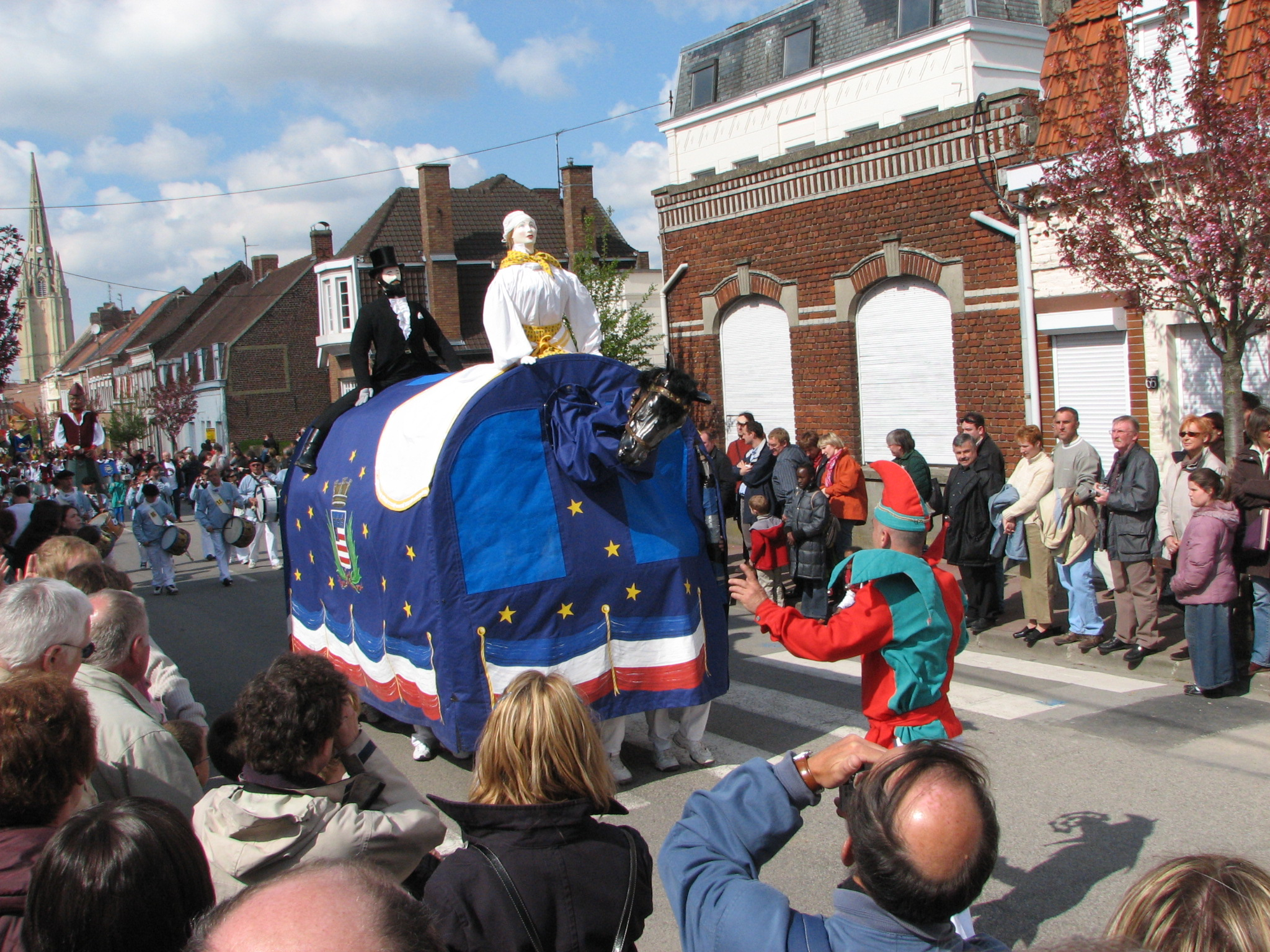
The Poulain from Pézenas (visiting Steenvoorde, in northeast France, for the Festival of Giants in 2006)

At Pézenas there is a huge creature called Le Poulain or Lo Polin (Occitan for "the colt"), carried by nine men and led by another, accompanied by a band of musicians. The Poulain has a realistically carved wooden head, with a snapping jaws and an extending neck that can reach up to first-floor windows; money or other offerings put into its mouth tumble down inside its neck. Its semi-cylindrical body is covered with a dark blue cloth, now decorated with stars and the coat of arms of Pézenas. Below the frame it has a tricolor skirt.

The Poulain carries two effigies on its back, one male, one female, called Estieinou and Estieinette (or Estieineta). Although the first written reference to the Poulain is from 1615, the creature is supposed to commemorate a visit to the town in 1226 by Louis VIII, during which the king's favourite mare fell ill. She had to be left behind in Pézenas while Louis continued with the Albigensian Crusade. On his return he was astonished to find that not only was his mare now fully recovered, but she had also given birth to a fine colt, which was duly presented to him, adorned with ribbons. In return he decreed that the town should construct a wooden colt to be used to celebrate all its public festivities (this legend was first recorded in 1701).

Its early appearances were on the public feast days of Saint Blaise (3 February), Saint John the Baptist (24 June) and the Feast of the Assumption (15 Aug). As a symbol of power, it also appeared at times when the town's prévôt distributed bread to the poor (the last such was in 1911), as well as visits by royalty or other dignitaries. The Poulain was burned in 1789, during the French Revolution, because of its royal associations, but was revived in 1803. Since then it has appeared at Mardi Gras and other festive occasions. Its framework, once a weighty construction of chestnut, has been made of aluminium since 1989.

Originally the Poulain had no riders; Estieinou and Estieinette (sometimes spelled Estiénon and Estiéneta in the French manner) are meant to recall another royal occasion when Louis XIII visited the town in 1622; the Maréchal de Bassompierre, following the King, was crossing the river Peyne on horseback. He saw a peasant-woman having difficulty making the crossing on foot and gallantly offered her a seat on his horse. Their merry arrival in the town caused great amusement and so the two effigies were made to remember the event.

There have been smaller, junior Poulains in Pézenas, made by or for children; the Pézenas fadas also have a full-sized version of their own. There have also been similar creatures or imitations elsewhere, some of which still continue. There is a very lively Poulain at Saint-Thibéry and others are (or have been) known at Adissan, Alignan-du-Vent, Florensac, Montblanc and Vias (where it is linked to a local legend of a medieval famine and is known as lo Pouli de la Fabo – the colt of the bean). They have also been recorded at Agde, Caux, Montagnac, Castelnau, Valros and Nizas, all in the Languedoc. An outlier in the Ariège, at St Pierre de Soulan, was instigated by a former inhabitant of Pézenas.

===== Lou chivalet or le chevalet =====
Hobby horses of the tourney type, with a frame suspended around the dancer's waist, can also appear at various festivities in the Languedoc. An illustration of the chivalet dance, and its traditional tune, and an old photograph of an animal of this type, are on show in the folk museum at Agde. It is particularly associated with Florensac, where it is called le chevalet, and is considered the town's totem.

The Chevalet of Cournonterral in the Hérault died out around 1980 but was revived in March 2011 as part of the annual carnival.

===== L'âne de Bessan =====
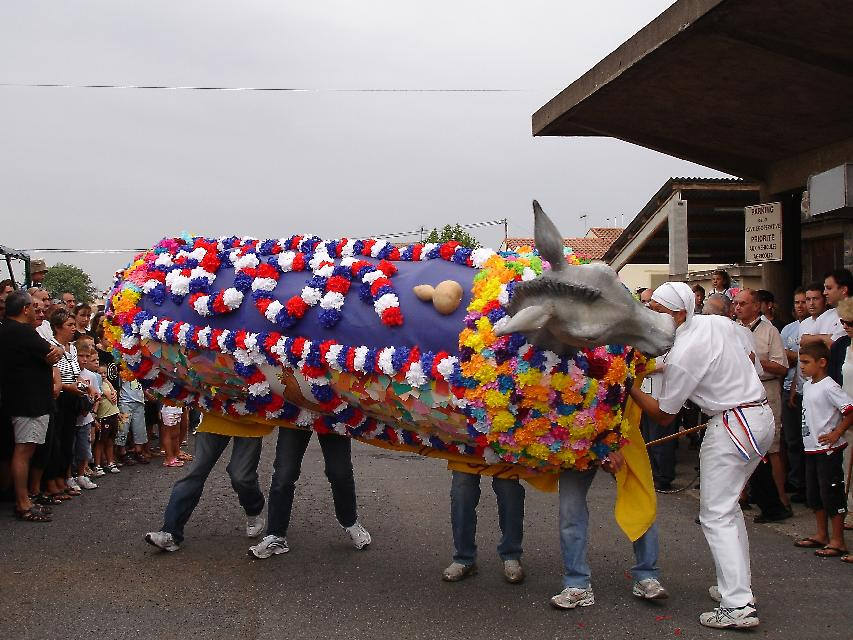
The Âne de Bessan

The Donkey or Ass of Bessan is another of the Languedoc's "totem" animals. Much smaller than the Poulain, it is made from a frame covered in cloth and decorated with crepe paper flowers and painted motifs. Under its skirt it is carried by four men, led by another who dresses in white, with a tricolor sash, and cracks a whip. The Âne dances from side to side and backwards and forwards to traditional tunes played nowadays on various instruments, although until the 1970s it was only the traditional hautbois (a type of oboe) and drums. Sometimes the beast bucks its hindquarters into the air, supported only by the leader and the first dancer, who twirls around; the other three stand ready to catch the frame as it descends. The Âne is brought out to open the feast of St Laurent, appearing first at 5pm on the Saturday closest to the saint's day, accompanied by firecrackers and bells, then again on the Sunday morning when it goes to a Mass to be blessed, before its final dance.

There is also an Âne at Gignac.

Le Cheval-Bayard de Clermont-l'Hérault was revived in 1988, after more than a century and a half. The town's original cheval-bayard was burned in 1815; known as the Bayard (baiard in Occitan), meaning a bay horse, its origins have been traced back to the 9th century.

===== Other "totem" animals of the Hérault =====
Perhaps the best-known is the Chameau (Camel) of Béziers, which dates from 1613, two years earlier than the Poulain of Pézenas. There is a large and impressive Boeuf (Bull) at Mèze, with a huge mouth; it is said to date back to at least 1229. Lo Picart, at Saint-Jean-de-Fos, is a ferocious ram; it has existed since at least 1683. Montagnac has a goat. Sometimes the choice of animal is based on a play on words: Loupian has, unsurprisingly, a wolf (Loup). (One of the most recent, and possibly the most bizarre, "totems" is Le Porquet of Pinet, a caterpillar, created in the early 1970s.)

===== Provence, Lei Chivaux Frus =====
Several "frisky horses", tourney hobby horses, accompany the traditional group Les Tambourinaires de Sant-Sumian, from Brignoles, a folklore revival group founded in 1942. Their performances are faithfully based on authentic traditions, such as the Chivau Frusc cited by author Frederic Mistral at Aix-en-Provence and folklorist Violet Alford, principally at Brignoles but also "all over southern Provence".

==== Germany ====
===== Odenwald: Christmas Bock, Esel and Schimmelreiter =====
Various creatures used to appear in the Odenwald around Christmas, including straw bears and bock figures(variations of which can also be found in Sweden and other parts of Scandiniavia around Midwinter and Christmas time perhaps having links to the Germanic God Thor and perhaps even older fertility rites). The bock (the name can be translated as "goat", "buck", "ram" or "stag") was made in a similar way to a mast horse, but using a long, two- or three-pronged hayfork that formed from its horns, covered in a white sheet, partly stuffed to form a head with a face painted onto it; these were sometimes held up outside windows to frighten the householder. Sometimes two people stood under the sheet to form a longer-bodied creature. Weihnachtsesels (Christmas donkeys) were made in a similar way, usually with two people bending over under a darker coloured blanket, rather like a pantomime horse.

The schimmelreiter was a more elaborate construction, made from two (or more) large sieves or riddles fastened in an upright position in front of and behind the "rider" at chest level. The front sieve had a stuffed fabric head and neck attached. The whole was covered with a sheet with a small hole in the centre to allow just the rider's head to show.

==== Ireland ====
===== Láir Bhán =====
The teams of Irish mummers known as Wrenboys who perform on Saint Stephen's Day (26 December) in pubs and private houses have been known to include a white hobby horse (Láir Bhán – cf. Laair Vane, above) of the tourney type, and this has survived into the present century, at Dunquin in County Kerry for example. At Ballycotton, in Co. Cork, a Láir bhán led a procession of horn-blowing youths at Halloween who collected money "in the name of Muck Olla" (a legendary giant boar).

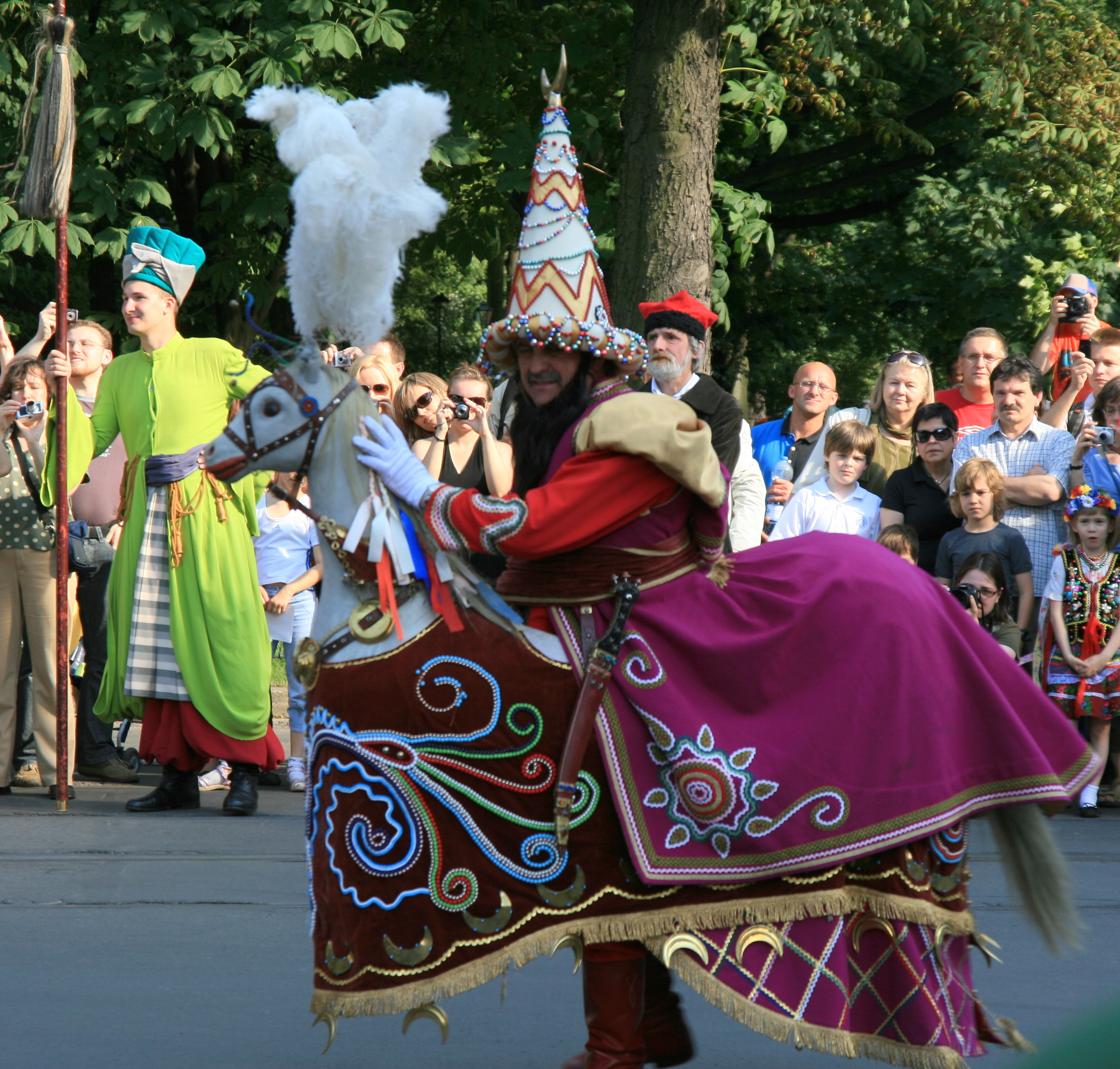
The Lajkonik

==== Poland ====
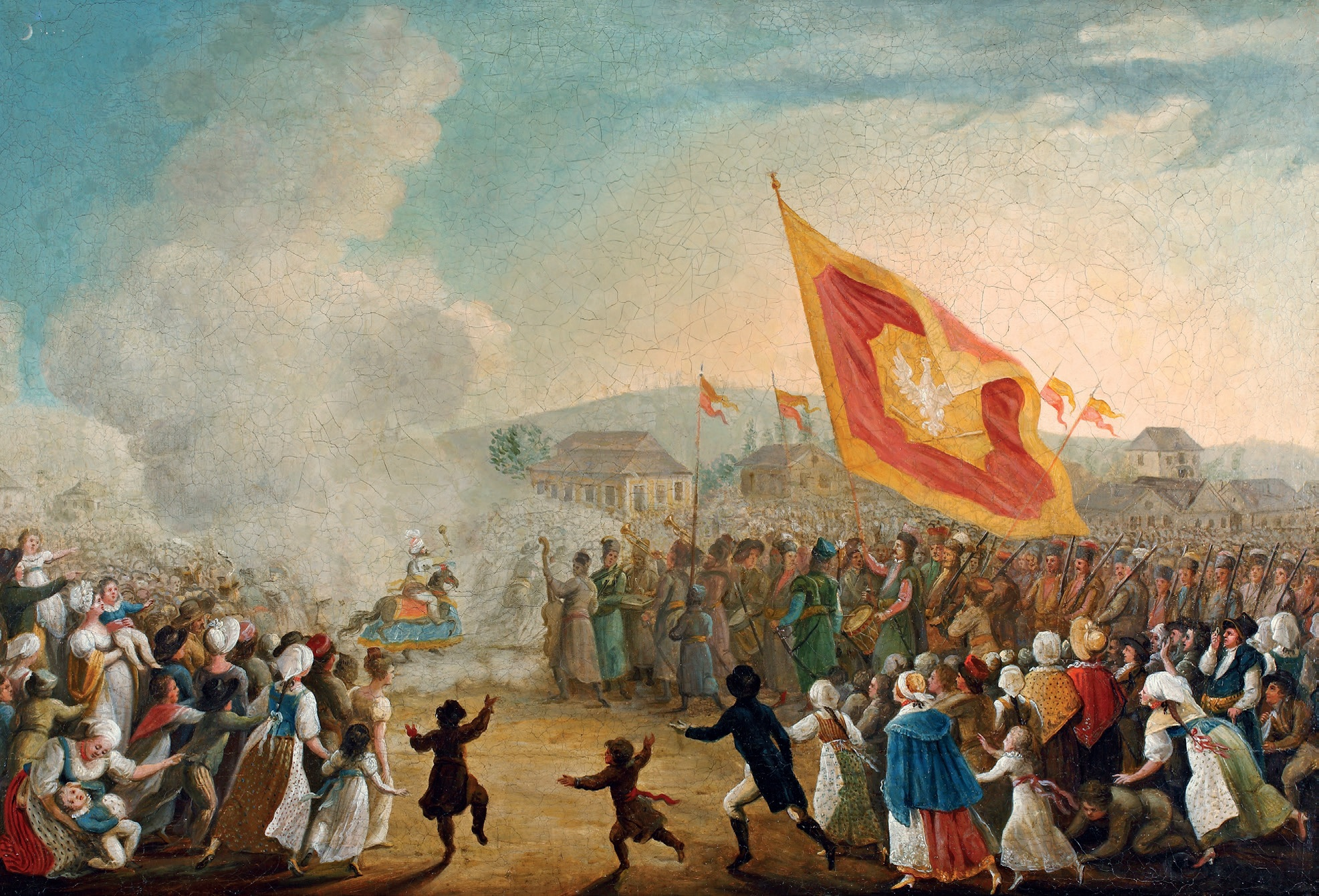
A painting of the Lajkonik celebrations from 1818 by Michał Stachowicz

===== Lajkonik =====
The city of Kraków has a hobby-horse called the Lajkonik which traditionally appears on the first Thursday after the religious feast of Corpus Christi and parades through the streets, collecting money, accompanied by musicians and costumed followers, some in traditional Polish costume, others in oriental dress, who carry horsetail insignia. The colourful costume of the Lajkonik represents a bearded Tatar warrior, who carries a golden mace and is mounted on a white horse. To be touched by the mace is said to bring good luck. The custom is said to have been carried on for 700 years, and various stories are told to explain its origins. The hobby horse has become an unofficial symbol of Kraków, and versions often appear as tourist attraction in the Market Square.

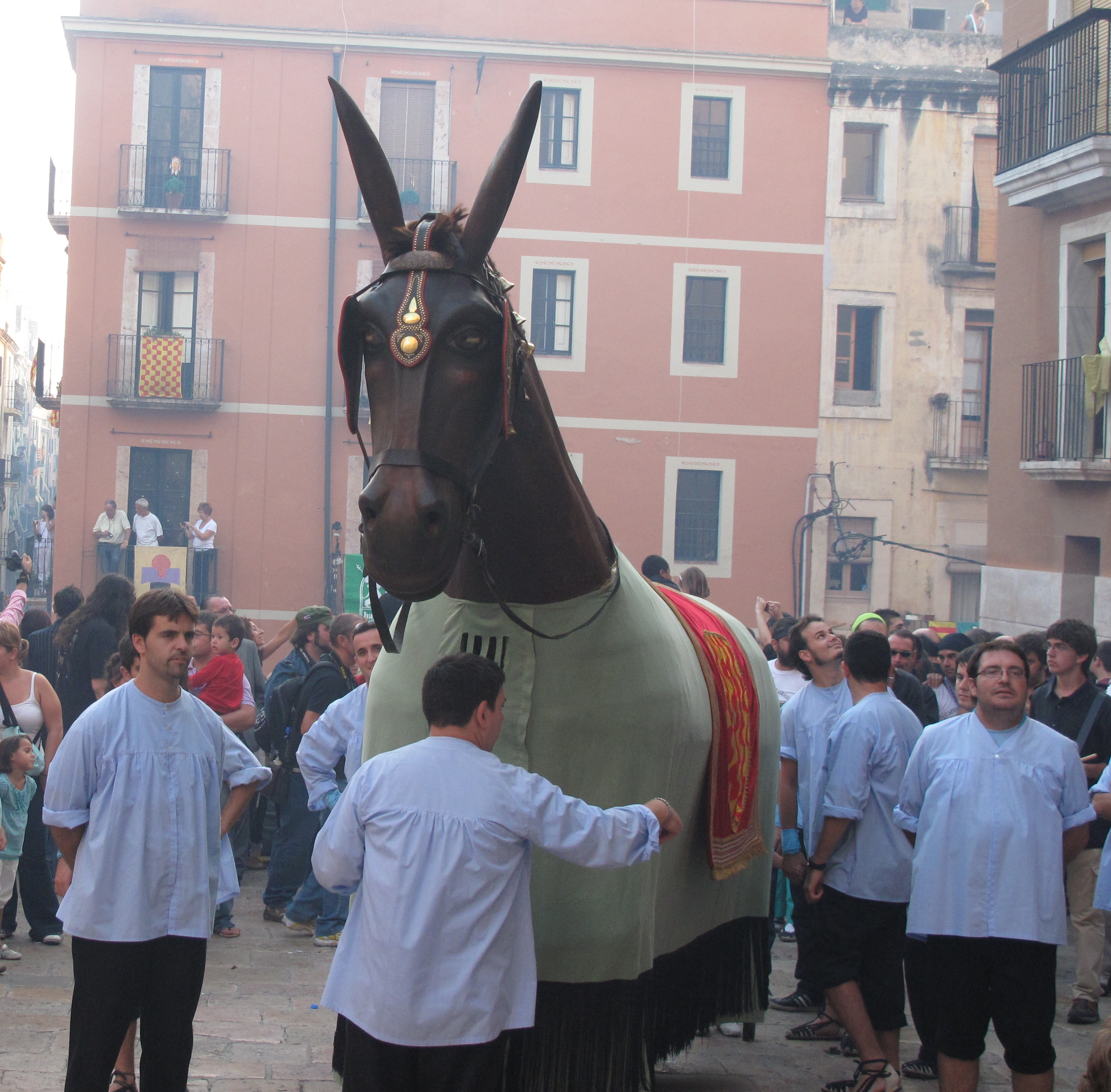
The mulassa (mule) of Tarragona, Spain

==== Spain ====
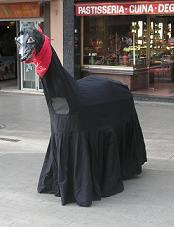
The mule of Sant Feliu de Llobregat, Catalonia, Spain

===== Basque areas =====
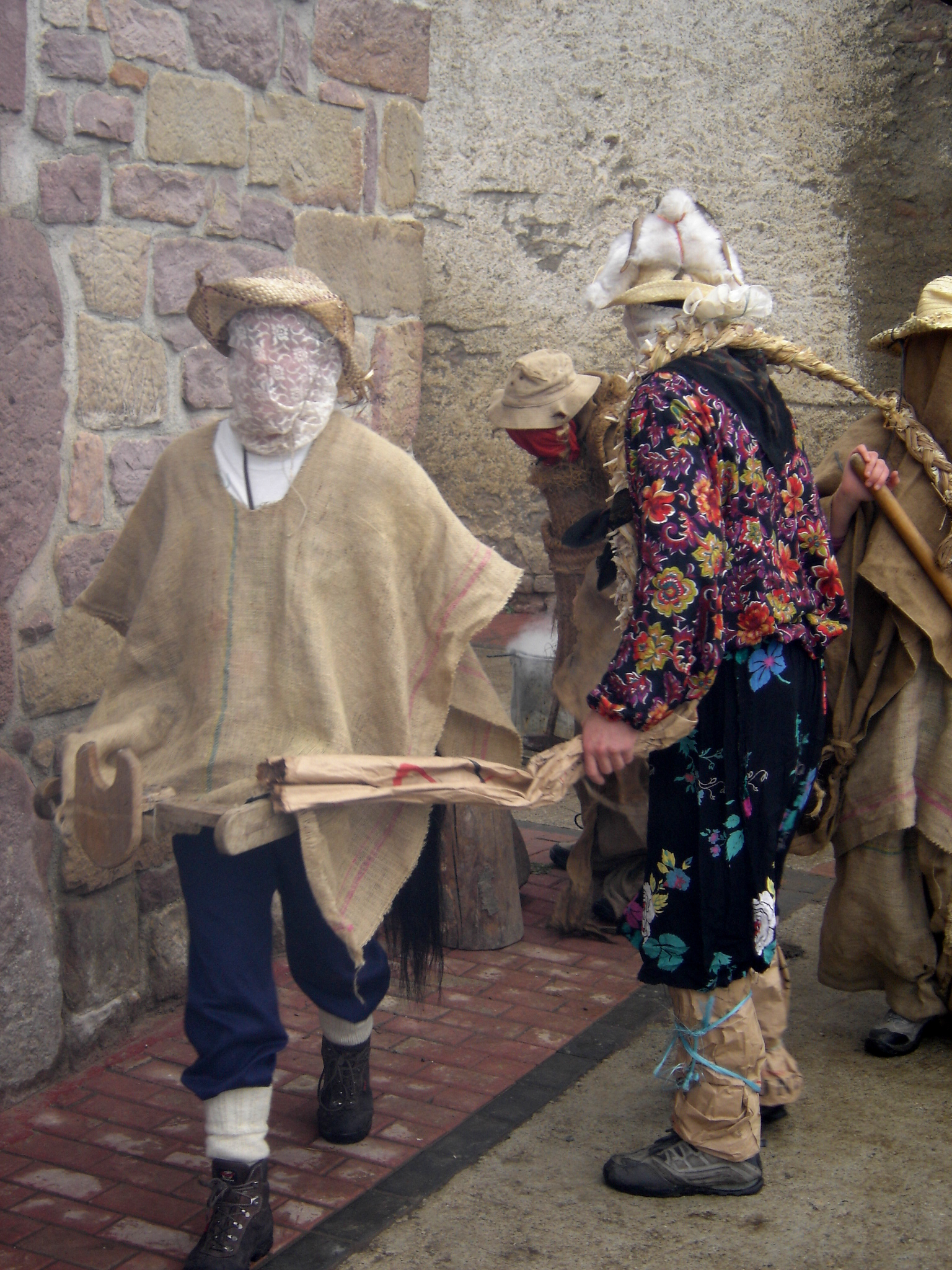
Zaldiko, a Basque hobby horse in Lantz, Spain

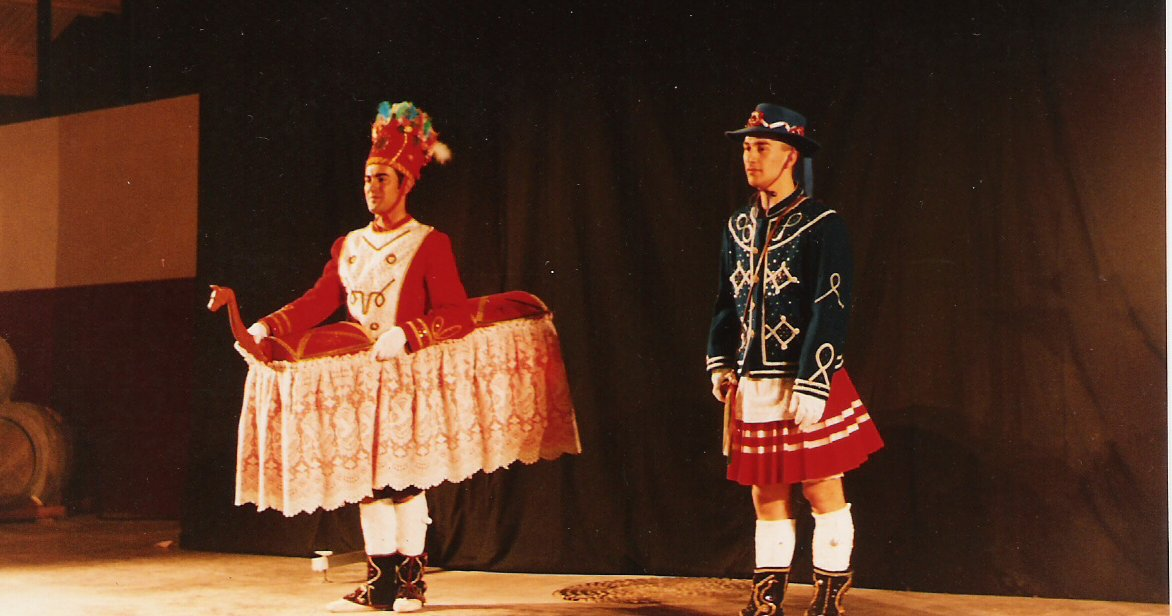
A Basque hobby horse at Alava, Spain, in 1994

The Basque country on the borders of France and Spain has a strong dance tradition. Several dances are linked to seasonal festivals. The zamaltzain, a hobby horse of the "tourney" type, with a small wooden head and a short, lacy skirt, takes part in some dances and processions in Zuberoa (La Soule, the easternmost part of the Basque country in Southern France) in places such as Ezpeize, Maule, Urdiñarbe, Barkoxe, Altza, Altzürükü and Atarratze. The "rider" wears elaborate costume of red or black including a koha', a tall, beribboned hat, which always has a mirror on the front. Zamaltzain means muleteer or mule-keeper. The dance in which the "mules" take part is danced by two teams, one dressed in red, the other in black, and is said by some scholars (such as Eugène Goyhénèche of the University of Pau) to represent an attack on a village by the men of another.

====== Carnaval de Lantz, Spain ======
A more rustic-looking horse of similar basic construction is part of the celebrations of the Carnival at Lantz, Spain. Called the zaldiko, it forms an essential part of the carnival procession, together with the ziripot, a strange character in an enormous straw-stuffed costume.

====== Parade of Giants and Big-heads, Pamplona ======
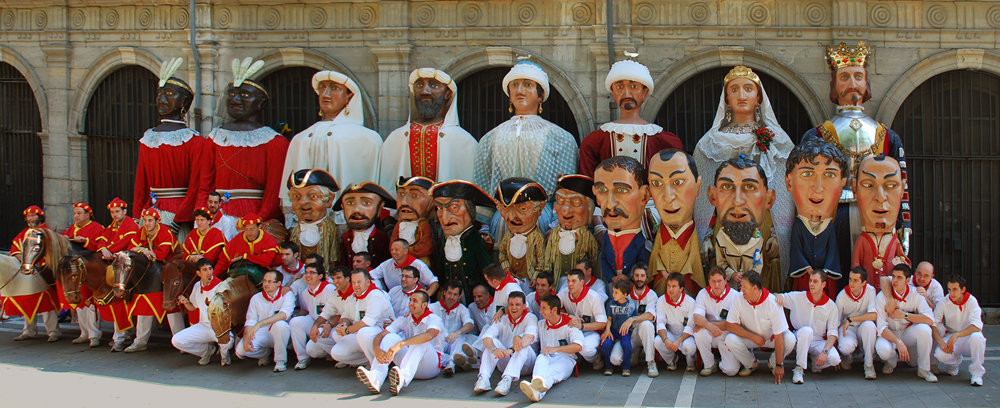
Pamplona's giants and big-heads, with the 6 zaldiko (far left)

Dressed in red trimmed with yellow, six tourney horses (xaldiko or zaldiko) take part in the comparsa de gigantes y cabezudos in Pamplona (Iruña) in Navarre, Spain (Nafarroa). More realistic than the other Basque examples, they replicate the whole upper part of a horse's body from head to tail, with a skirt attached below. Each "rider" wears a pointed cap with a tassel and used to wield an inflated bladder on a stick; now, like the tricorned big-heads called kilikis who parade with them, they carry a phallic pizzle made of foam-rubber which they use to belabour the onlookers.

===== Catalonia =====
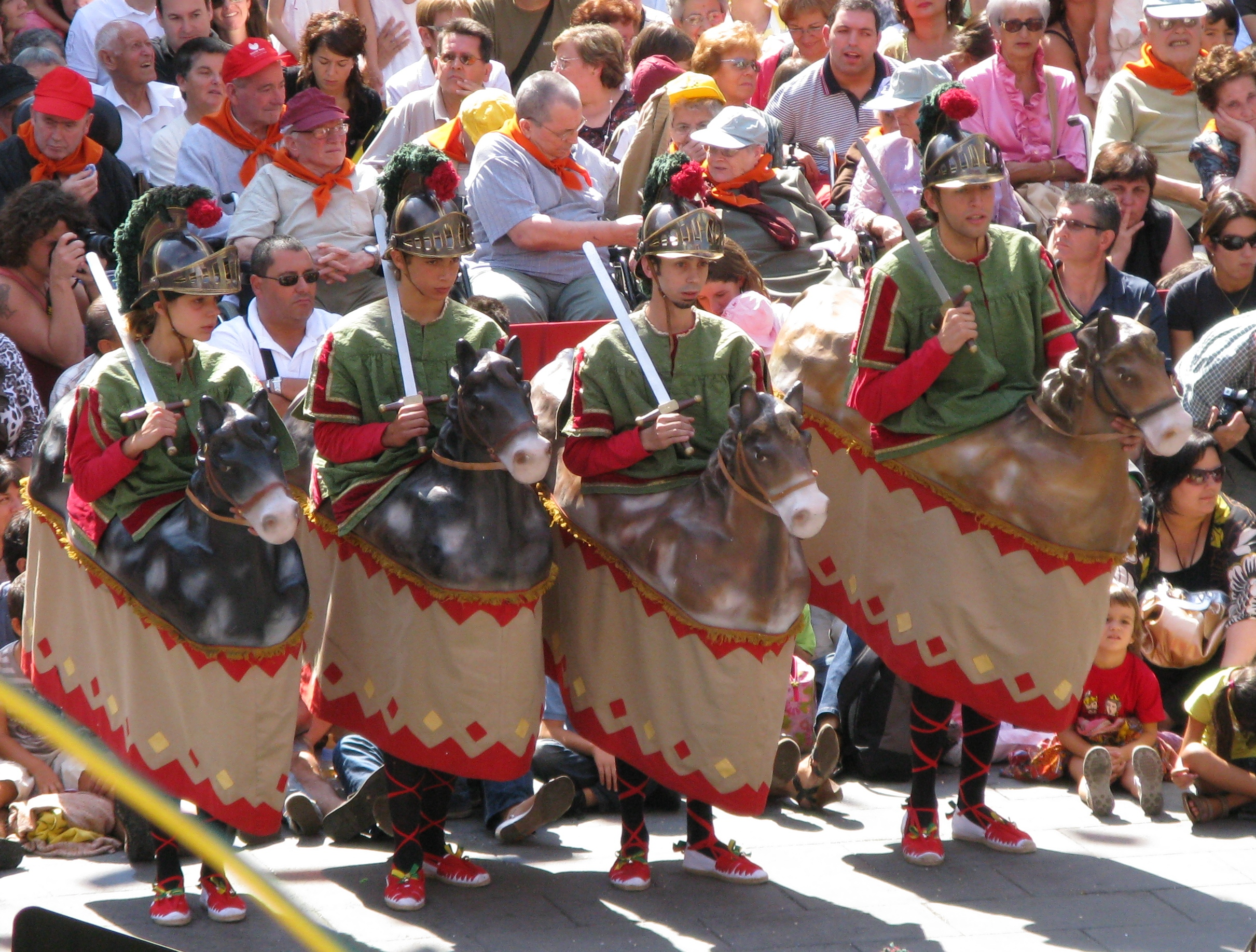
Els cavallets (the little horses) at Olot, Catalonia

There are many festivals in the Catalonia region of north-east Spain which involve processions with giants and outsize animals; some also involve hobby horses (of the "tourney" type, but with a more-or-less realistic head and body, nowadays often constructed from fibreglass).

Larger figures of mules are also found in several places, carried by two performers whose legs are visible beneath a skirt hanging from the animal's hollow body. In addition, dragons of various sorts are also popular, as are bulls, eagles and lions; many have fireworks attached to them, or set off around them.

====== Festes de Santa Tecla, Tarragona ======
The Santa Tecla Festival takes place at Tarragona from 15 to 24 September and includes the saint's day, 23 September. A number of animals, real and mythical, are impersonated in the parades that form a major part of the festivities. Among them is a larger-than-life Mulassa (mule) carried by two dancers who are hidden under its skirts, apart from their legs.

The other creatures that take part are the àliga (eagle), bou (bull), cucafera (coco, a mythical monster), drac de Sant Roc (dragon of Saint Roch), lleó (lion), and víbria (a female wyvern with prominent breasts). Several of these have fireworks attached to their extremities, or are showered with sparks by their attendants, and are a spectacular sight.

=== Asia ===
==== Indonesia ====
===== Kuda Kepang, Kuda Lumping or Jaran Kepang =====
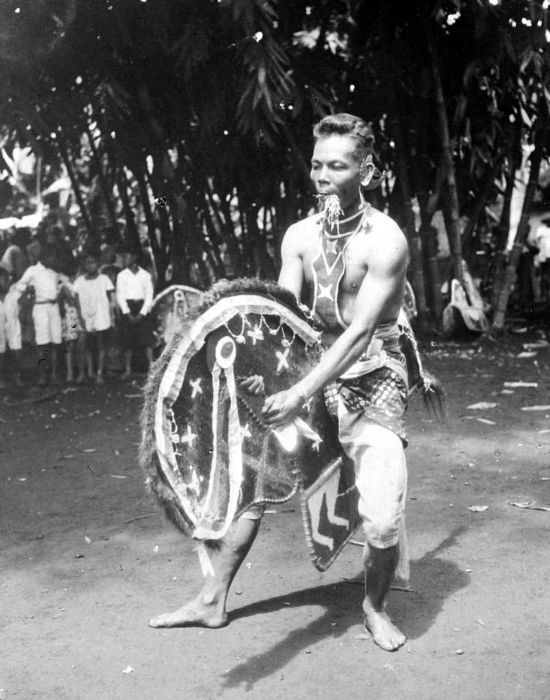
Kuda Kepang dancer in a trance, eating straw, like a horse (1928)

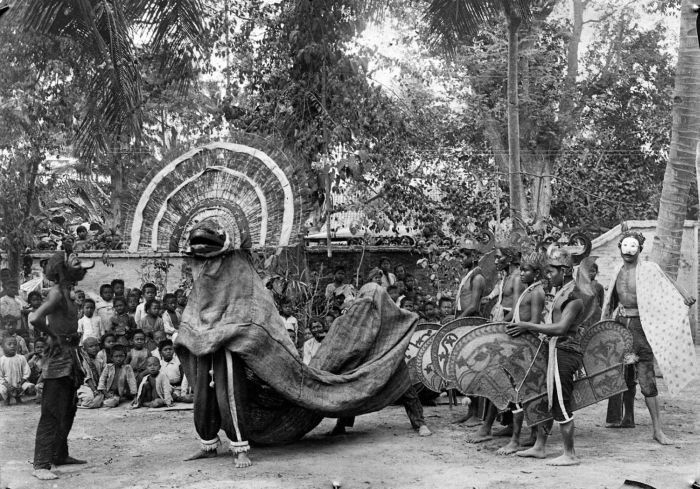
Four Kuda Kepang hobby horses with Reog Ponogoro (tiger masked dancers), East Java

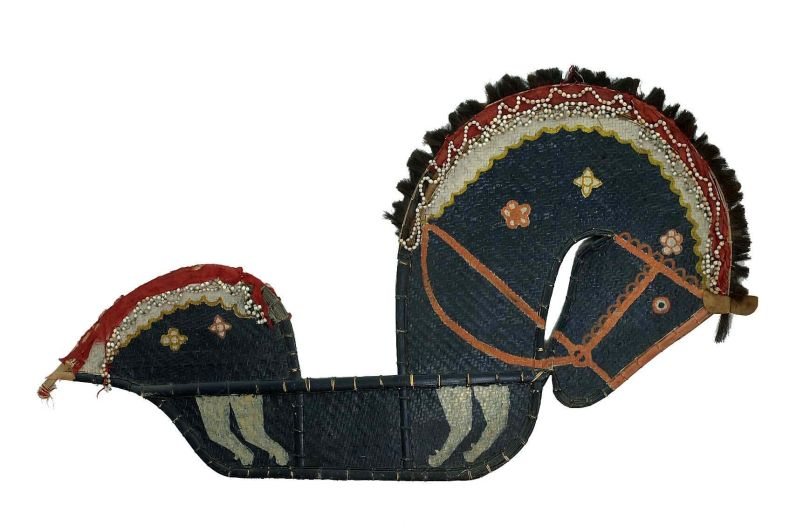
A black kuda kepang of woven bamboo from Yogyakarta

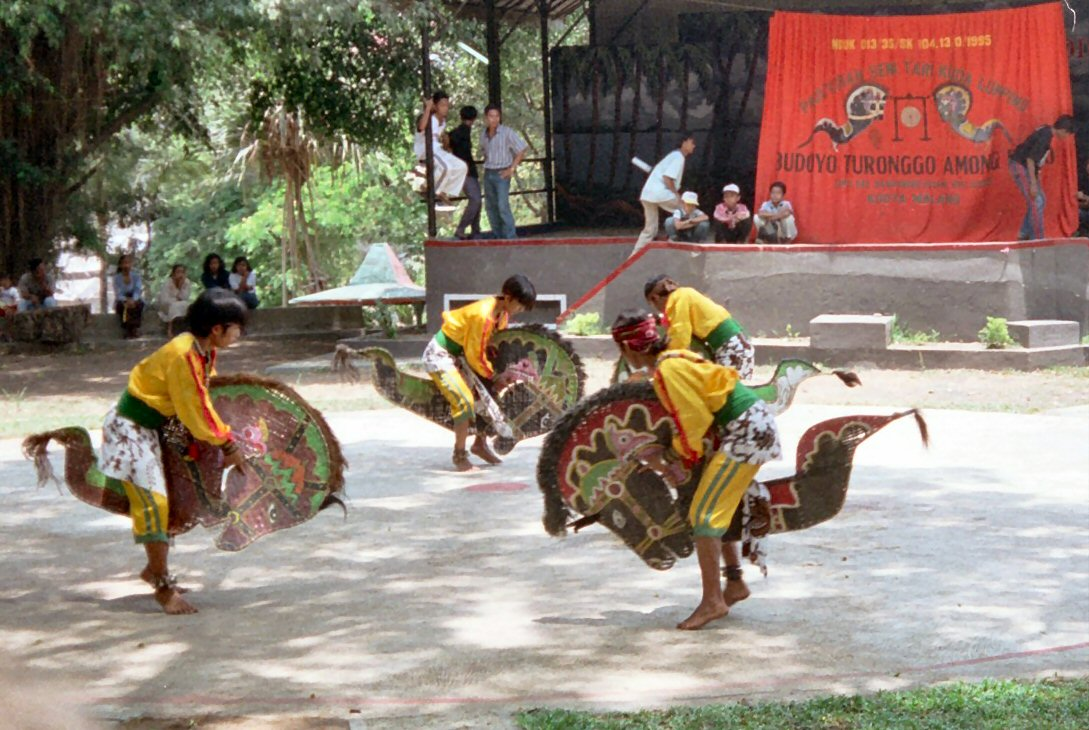
Modern Malay folk dance display (2005)

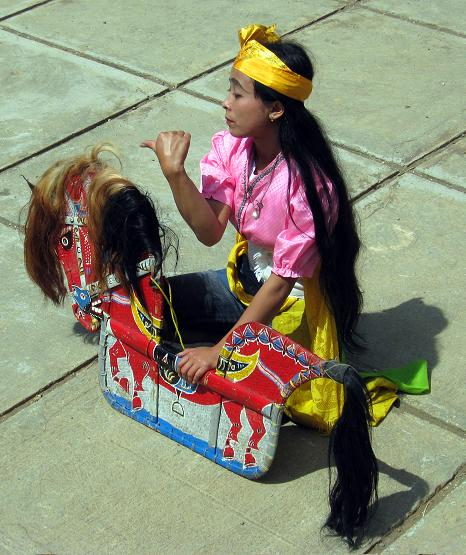
Female Kuda Lumping dancer in Cemoro village, Temanggung (2011)

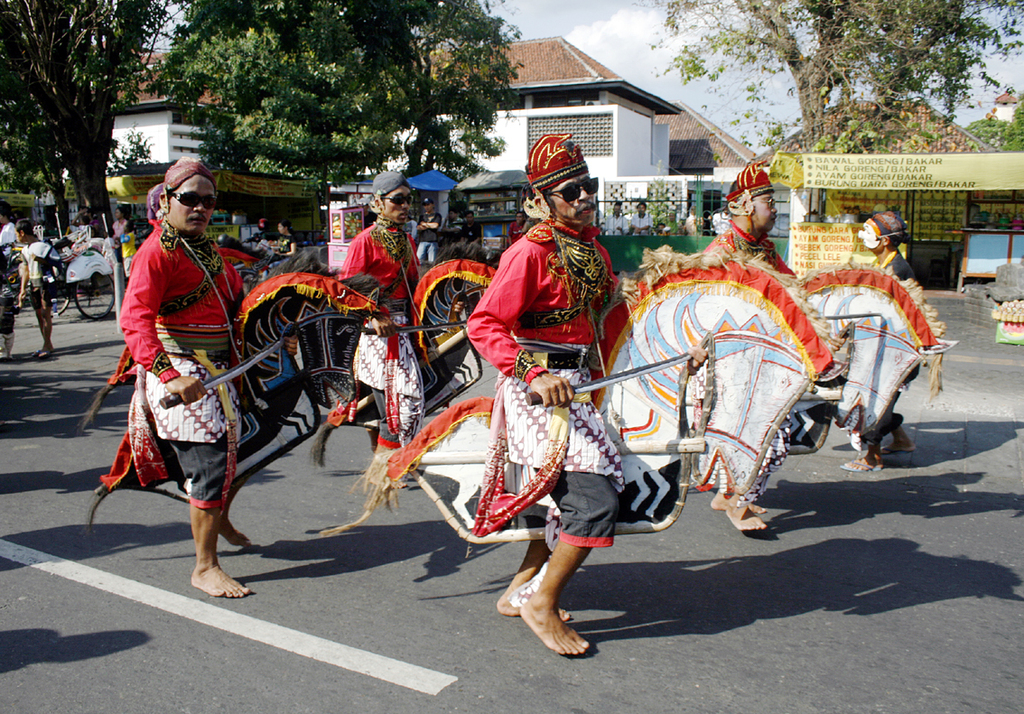
Modern Kuda Lumping (or Jaran Kepang) procession in Yogyakarta (2008)

Kuda Lumping (woven bamboo horses, also known as Kuda Kepang or Jaran Kepang) is a traditional Javanese dance depicting a group of horsemen from island of Java, Indonesia. Dancers "ride" horses made from woven bamboo and decorated with colorful paints and cloth. Generally, the dance portrays troops riding horses, but another type of Kuda Lumping performance also incorporates trances and magic tricks.

The art has been introduced into neighbouring Johore and Singapore by Javanese migrants where it is performed at weddings by special dancing troupes. Led by a Danyang, a typical troupe today comprises 9 horsemen, 2 medicine men, 5 gamelan musicians and 9–15 'guardians'.

Modern performances re-enact the stories of the legendary nine Muslim saints (Wali Songo) who brought Islam to Java, but nowadays they are often kept brief and intended simply for entertainment; they may even be performed by women. The gamelan percussion orchestra is made up of 2 drums, a hanging gong, two knobbed gongs on a wooden frame, and 5 tubular bamboo chimes called angklung.

Details of the fuller, more elaborate performances, however, include states of shamanistic trance-like possession, and the custom may have originally been a form of totemic worship.

Photographs from the early 20th century, in the collection of Amsterdam's Tropenmuseum (Museum of the Tropics), show another ritual dance, the Reog Ponorogo, involving a huge tiger mask and costume (Singa Barong), accompanied by Jatil riding woven bamboo hobby horses who perform the Jaran Kepang dance.

=== North America ===
==== Newfoundland Mummering ====
In Newfoundland, hobby horses of the "mast" type were sometimes used by the mummers or 'janneys' who went mummering around the Christmas season; they also took a Christmas bull, made in a similar manner, on their house-to-house visits. The mischievous horse was not intended to be malevolent, but its appearance and antics often frightened those it visited or encountered. Mummering was dying out but has enjoyed a recent revival, and the first Mummers Festival (held in St John's in December 2009) even had workshops on making hobby horses.

== Cultural references ==
A May-Day procession including a Teaser, a Fool, and a Hobby Horse that tries to capture women under its skirts features in the climactic scenes of the 1973 British cult-horror flick The Wicker Man.

== Other meanings ==
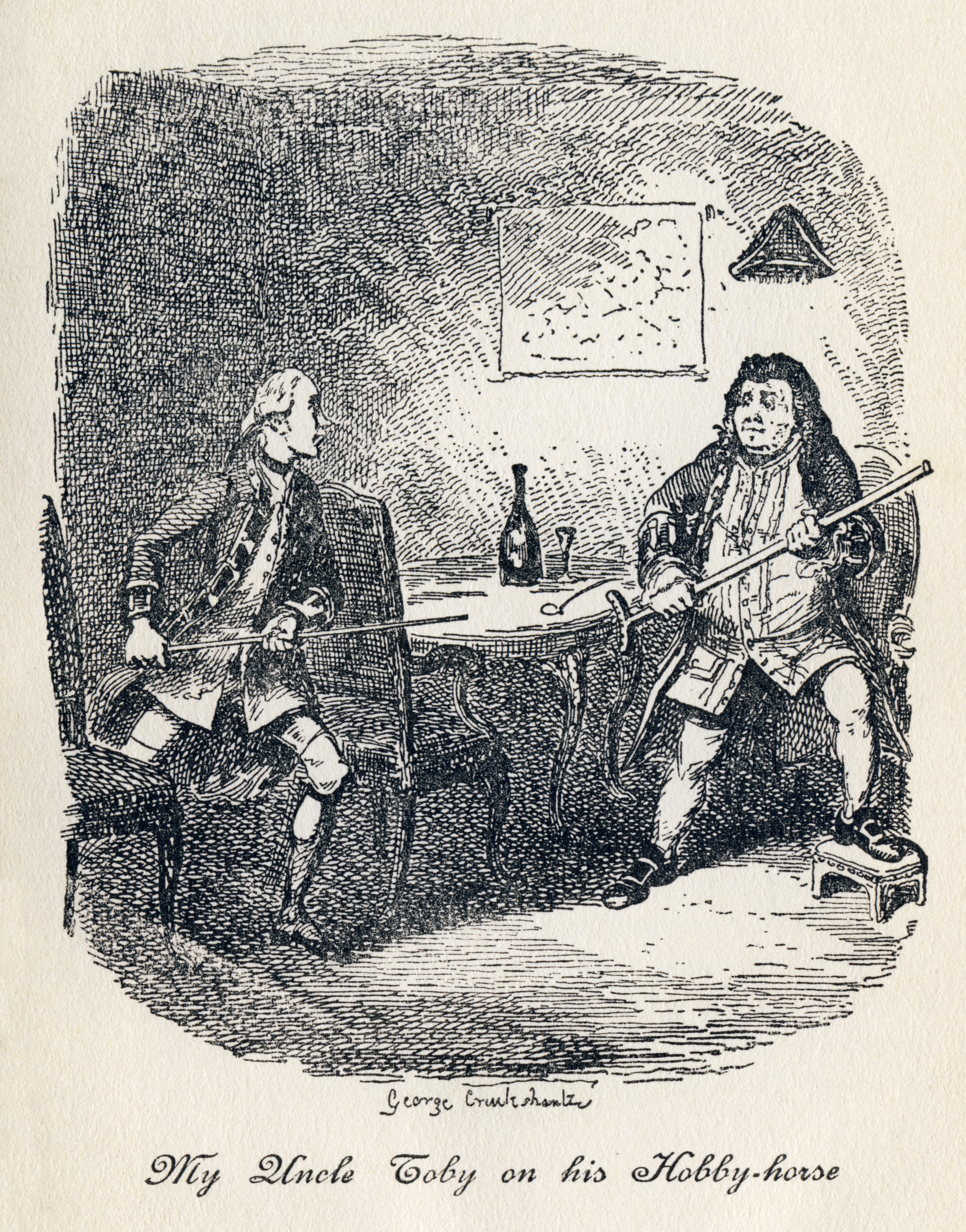
In The Life and Opinions of Tristram Shandy, Gentleman, the characters' hobby-horses, or particular obsessions, are discussed in detail. Here, Uncle Toby's obsession with the military leads to him and Trim – who gets caught up in Toby's enthusiasm – to begin acting out military actions. Illustration by George Cruikshank.

From the term "hobby horse" came the expression "to ride one's hobby-horse", formerly meaning "to follow a favourite pastime". So a hobby horse came to mean a topic which preoccupies someone to the point of obsession (cf. idée fixe). It also gave rise to the modern sense of hobby.

The term is also connected to the draisine, a forerunner of the bicycle, invented by Baron Karl von Drais. In 1818, a London coach-maker named Denis Johnson began producing an improved version, which was popularly known as the "hobby-horse".

The artistic movement, Dada, is possibly named after a French child's word for hobby horse.

The term is also nautical. A vessel that is pitching forward and backward into the sea harmonically is said to be hobby horsing.

== See also ==
- Bumba Meu Boi – a similar Brazilian tradition with an ox instead of a horse
- Capra (goat dance) – a similar balkan tradition with a goat instead of a horse
- Hobby horse (toy)
- Hooden horse
- Dorset Ooser – an unrelated but similar custom
- Dada – an art movement based on the French word for hobby horse
- Pantomime horse
