= Straw Bear (disambiguation) =

The phrase straw bear may refer to the following:

- Straw Bear, an American racehorse
- The Whittlesea Straw Bear, a revival of a traditional seasonal custom in the UK. The name is also used for the festival at which the straw bear now appears
- Straw bear (German traditional character), traditional characters in seasonal rituals and processions in parts of Germany
