= Strohschab =

Austrian costumes representing cockroaches

Strohschab are Austrian costumes representing cockroaches. They are made of hay or straw and are used in Saint Nicholas parades.
