= Studnice (Chrudim District) =

- Municipality
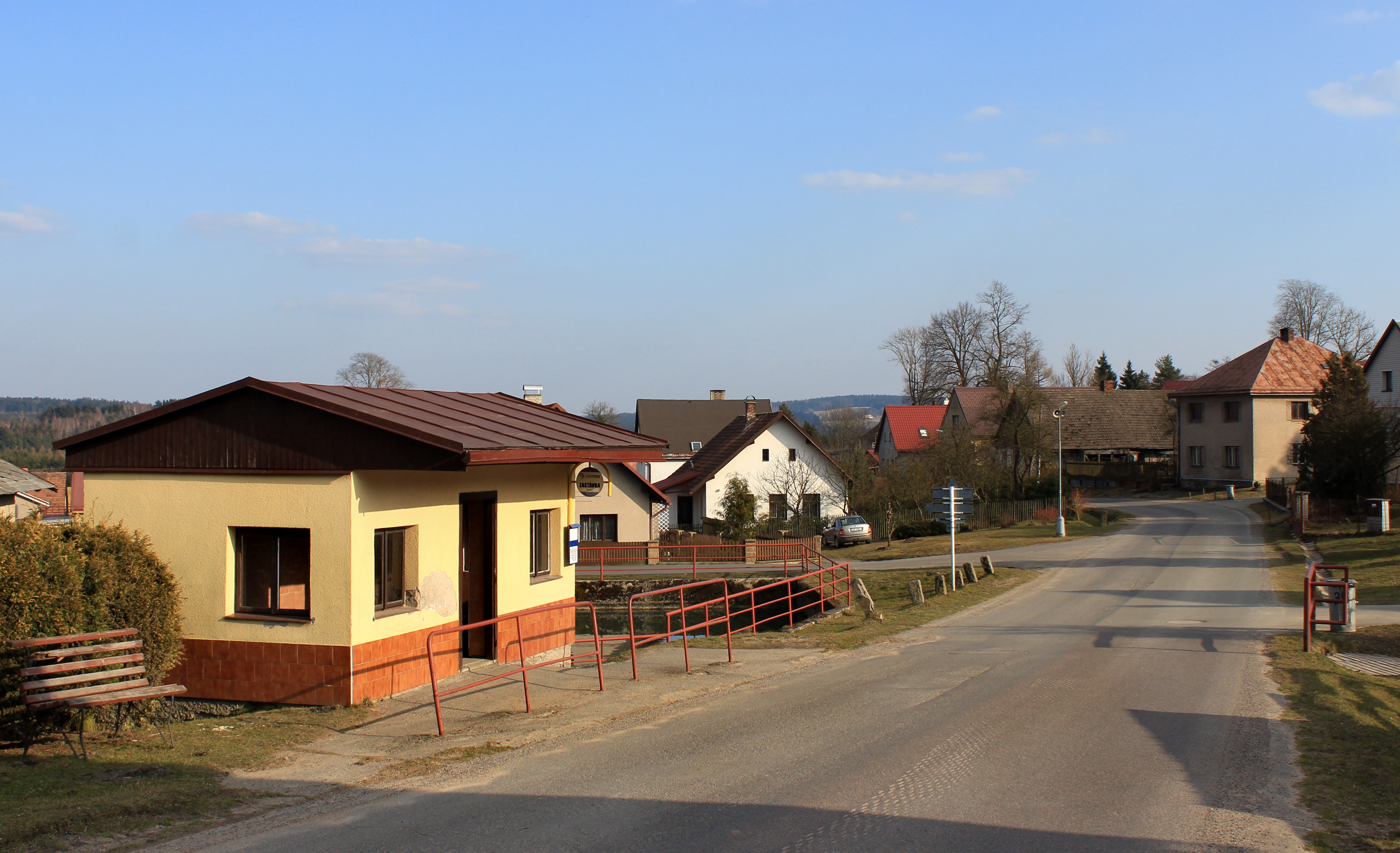
- Bus stop by the main road

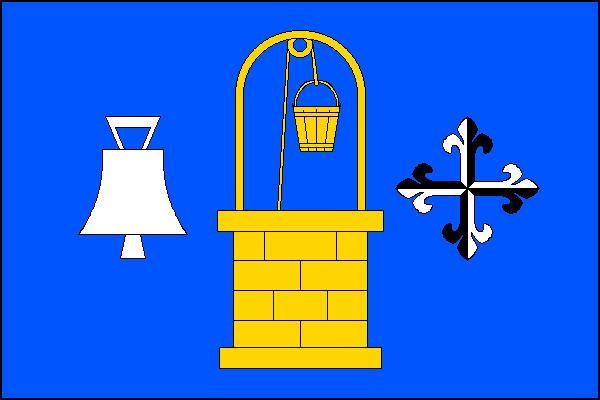
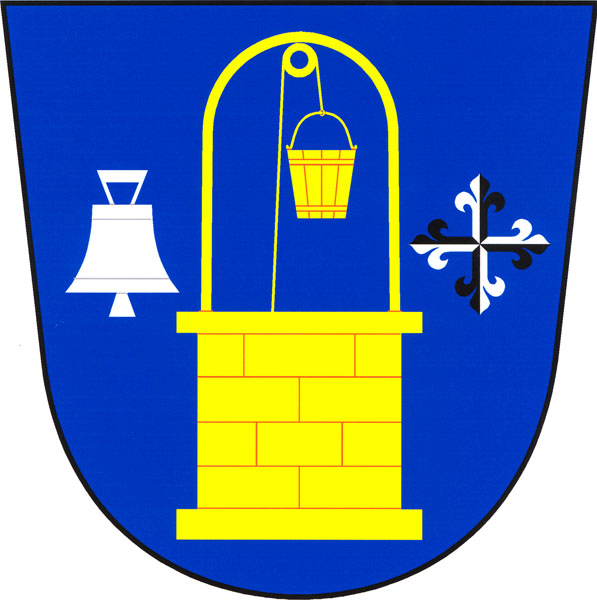
- Flag Coat of arms

- Location in the Czech Republic
- Coordinates: 49°44′17″N 15°54′11″E
- Country: Czech Republic
- Region: Pardubice
- District: Chrudim
- First mentioned: 1392

Area
  - Total: 15.72 km^{2} (6.07 sq mi)
- Elevation: 624 m (2,047 ft)

Population (2026-01-01)
  - Total: 455
  - Density: 28.9/km^{2} (75.0/sq mi)
- Time zone: UTC+1 (CET)
  - Summer (DST): UTC+2 (CEST)
- Postal code: 539 01
- Website: www.obecstudnice.cz

Studnice is a municipality and village in Chrudim District in the Pardubice Region of the Czech Republic. It has approximately 500 inhabitants.

== Administrative division ==
Studnice consists of three municipal parts (in brackets population according to the 2021 census):

- Studnice (400)
- Košinov (36)
- Zalíbené (15)

== Demographics ==
Historical population
Year	Pop.	±%
1869	879	—
1880	917	+4.3%
1890	865	−5.7%
1900	935	+8.1%
1910	983	+5.1%
1921	941	−4.3%
1930	997	+6.0%
1950	766	−23.2%
1961	729	−4.8%
1970	677	−7.1%
1980	589	−13.0%
1991	493	−16.3%
2001	465	−5.7%
2011	446	−4.1%
2021	451	+1.1%
Source: Censuses
