= Vortová =

- Municipality
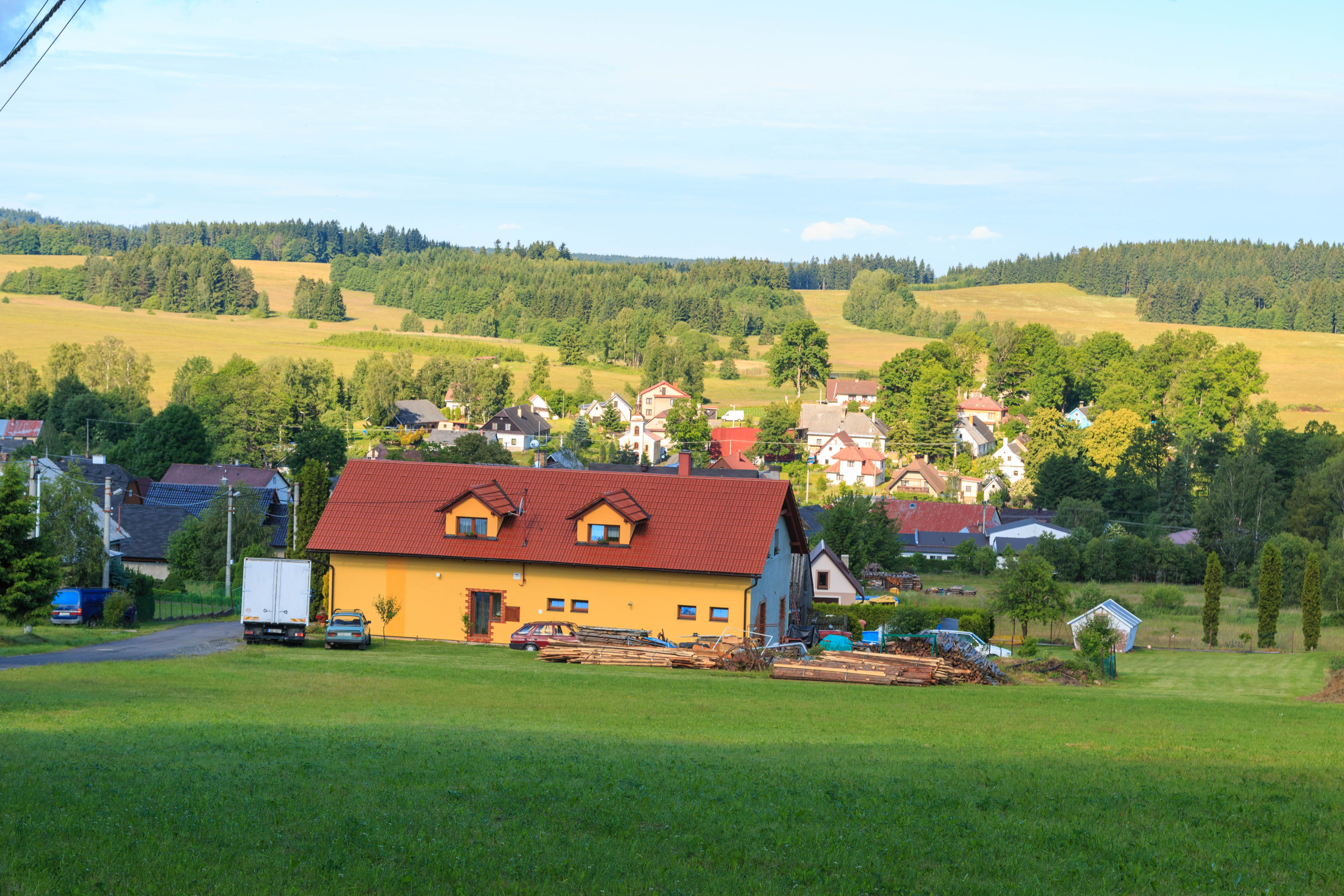
- View from the east

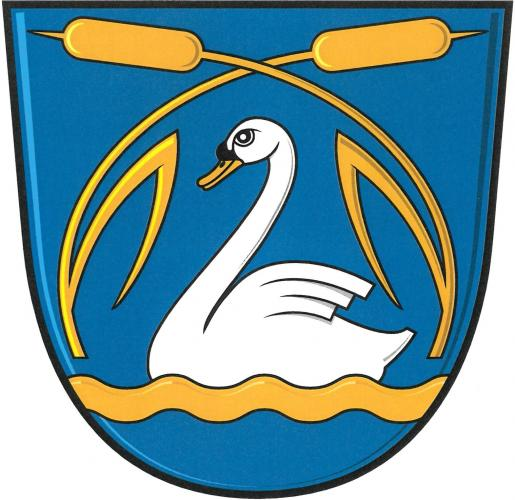
- Coat of arms

- Location in the Czech Republic
- Coordinates: 49°42′47″N 15°56′11″E
- Country: Czech Republic
- Region: Pardubice
- District: Chrudim
- First mentioned: 1548

Area
  - Total: 12.16 km^{2} (4.70 sq mi)
- Elevation: 612 m (2,008 ft)

Population (2026-01-01)
  - Total: 234
  - Density: 19.2/km^{2} (49.8/sq mi)
- Time zone: UTC+1 (CET)
  - Summer (DST): UTC+2 (CEST)
- Postal code: 539 01
- Website: www.vortova.cz

Vortová is a municipality and village in Chrudim District in the Pardubice Region of the Czech Republic. It has about 200 inhabitants.

== Administrative division ==
Vortová consists of two municipal parts (in brackets population according to the 2021 census):

- Vortová (196)
- Lhoty (26)

== Demographics ==
Historical population
Year	Pop.	±%
1869	534	—
1880	514	−3.7%
1890	511	−0.6%
1900	485	−5.1%
1910	513	+5.8%
1921	489	−4.7%
1930	577	+18.0%
1950	411	−28.8%
1961	451	+9.7%
1970	390	−13.5%
1980	330	−15.4%
1991	274	−17.0%
2001	255	−6.9%
2011	249	−2.4%
2021	222	−10.8%
Source: Censuses
