= Flitter Dance =

Manx traditional dance

The Flitter Dance (Flitter Daunsey in Manx) is a traditional dance from the Isle of Man associated with Good Friday. It was collected by Mona Douglas in the 1940s or 50s and is popular among younger Manx dancers today.

== History ==
The traditional custom on Good Friday on the Isle of Man was to gather shellfish on the shore and eat flitters in particular for breakfast, after cooking them in the fire without the use of iron. A dance was collected in connection to these customs by Mona Douglas, who first mentioned it as ‘partly noted but still incomplete’ in 1937.

Her informant at this stage, a Mrs Callow of Cardle Veg, Maughold, was able to recall the process of gathering mychurachan to make a fire on the beach, in which "arran-traaie" barleymeal cakes were made and baked in the hot ashes and flitters were baked in their shells. After the meal accompanied by milk, the remains were thrown into the sea with the words: ‘Gow shoh as bannee orrin’ (‘Take this and bless us’) spoken as ‘some kind of prayer or charm.’ It was after this that the Flitter Dance was performed, by pairs of dancers to ‘wind to and fro in the shape of an S,’ however, no steps or details of the actual dance were recalled by Mrs Callow.

By 1957 Douglas had completed the collection of the dance, thanks to material from a Mrs Teare of Ballaugh and in particular from Ada Skillicorn and a Mrs Radcliffe of Maughold, who were able to provide the actual steps of the dance. The distinctive stamping step involved is not found in other traditional Manx dances and it was noted by Douglas as being ‘presumably used to stamp out any remaining live embers in the fires.’ It was perhaps through these informants that Douglas learned that this dance was once the only dance permitted on Good Friday, that the throwing of the remnants of the food into the sea was linked to ‘a very ancient Celtic ritual’ and that it and the dance are a ‘survival of a very ancient Gaelic ceremony of propitiation or sacrifice to powers of the sea.’

The tune for the dance was also collected by Mona Douglas, who noted that 'the air belonging to this dance strikes me as very ancient, probably the oldest of all our Manx tunes.'

The dance was brought back into performance in the 1960s by the Manx Folk Dance Society, who also revived the custom of Manx dancing at Easter. The first known modern performance of the Flitter Dance was given by the Manx Folk Dance Society, under Mona Douglas’ supervision, on 18 April 1960 at a performance in Ballakermeen School for the visiting members of the English Folk Dance and Song Society.

== Dance ==
The Flitter Dance was first published in Rinkaghyn Vannin in 1983. No mention is made here of an S-shape to the dance; rather, it is described merely as ‘in processional form.’ It is in this form that the dance is performed today.

The dance is in two halves: firstly, the distinctive stamp steps; then two sets of side-steps and the Manx Balance (a distinctive swinging of the foot in a kicking motion), before re-joining the same partners and repeating.

Because of its simple and repetitive form, the dance is popular today for beginners and young dancers alike.
