= Hop-tu-Naa (dance) =

Folk dance tradition of the Isle of Man

Hop-tu-naa is a traditional Manx dance connected to the hop-tu-naa festivities around 31 October in the Isle of Man. It is a simple processional dance for any number of two pairs of dancers. The dance shares its name with the festivities and the music to which the dance is connected.

== Description ==
The processional dance has two parts, each consisting of eight bars of music. The first part consists of pairs of dancers performing the Manx Reel Step; ‘three running steps keeping the feet close to the ground and a hop on the fourth beat swinging the free foot across in front of the ankle with a slight inward kick.’

The second part of the dance consists of groups of two couples taking it in turns to create arches for the others to pass under. After the third time, the second couple let go of their hands to allow the first couple to step through to lead into the first part of the dance again.

The dance is performed to the hop-tu-naa tune, first published in a complete form by Mona Douglas. Today the music is most commonly taken from its transcription in Rinkaghyn Vannin or Kiaull yn Theay, both of which were made by Colin Jerry.

== History ==
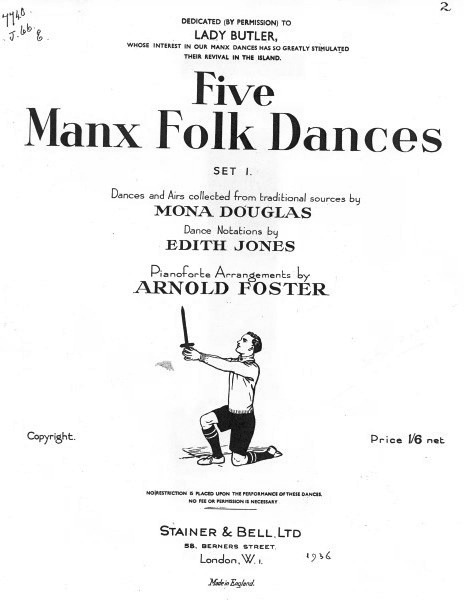
Mona Douglas Five Manx Folk Dances

The dance was collected by Mona Douglas from children she met in the road in Laxey. As Douglas noted for other dances, it is possible that this dance was collected from children as it had been retained as a children's game rather than as a formal folk dance. It is not known at what date it was collected, but it was first mentioned as having been complete and collected in the Five Manx Folk Dances published in 1936. It was first published in Seven Manx Folk Dances.

Douglas’ writings about the dance offer differing descriptions for the circumstances of its performance. Her published writings refer to its having been performed as a part of a Hollantide procession through Douglas carrying turnip lanterns, but other notes she speaks of its being linked to beating the bounds and the leaving of turnips and other vegetables at the doors of neighbours.

Other unpublished notes by Douglas refer to the dance as having been performed at occasions other than at hop-tu-naa, such as at the Mheillea, turf cutting and the boat supper. The overlooking of these other uses of the dance has been explained with reference to the need for Douglas to name the otherwise nameless dance when publishing:

As a simple processional dance [hop-tu-naa] would be used for any procession and was not connected with one specific calendar custom. However, upon the need for publication a name would have been settled on, and as a well known calendar custom would give the dance more historical credence it would seem reasonable to settle on that element of the dance for publication purposes.

Douglas' writings refer to another 'slightly different' version of the dance having been collection by Philip Leighton Stowell. However, no records of this dance are known of amongst the Leighton Stowell publications or unpublished papers.

== Contemporary use ==
The dance is one of the most widely performed dances today in the Isle of Man. This is mainly due to its simplicity, which allows it to be taught to children in Manx schools from a young age. It can be seen in public as a popular dance for Ceilis on the Isle of Man, as well as at many of the community events organised across the Isle of Man for hop-tu-naa. It can also be seen at dance performances by the Island's many dance groups.
