= Rinkaghyn Vannin =

Book of Manx dances published in 1938

Rinkaghyn Vannin ("Manx Dances" in Manx) is an important book of 28 Manx dances, mostly collected by Mona Douglas, which was published in 1983 by Sleih gyn Thie.

The vast majority of the traditional dances of the Isle of Man were collected by Mona Douglas. Although twelve of her collected dances appeared in two volumes made with Arnold Foster, in 1936 and 1953, 13 further dances remained unpublished until the appearance of Rinkaghyn Vannin.

Manx dancing had been popularly performed since the late 1920s, but it was seen as merely a spectacle until it was taken up in the Manx folk revival of the 1970s. It was in 1975 that the dance group, Bock Yuan Fannee, was formed by Colin Jerry specifically to perform Manx dances. Working closely with Mona Douglas, together they reconstructed the remaining dances from Douglas’ notes. It was from this group that Rinkaghyn Vannin emerged, with Jerry preparing the airs, instrumental guides and dancing instructions.

In her Introduction to the collection, Douglas noted that besides those composed by Leighton Stowell (which were under copyright restrictions), Rinkaghyn Vannin contained ‘all the Manx dances.’ Amongst the 28 songs published in Rinkaghyn Vannin were thirteen dances notated for the first time, seven of which had not been known of previously. Also published in the collection was a dance newly created: 'Dance for Five', composed by B. Carswell, M. & C. Hall, B. Williamson and J. Cowell.

In addition to the dances instructions, the book also contained a description of a dance for which no detailed notes had been obtained ('Lheim y Braddan' / 'The Salmon Leap'); a reprint of a version of the 'White Boys' Play' from 1832 (as a prelude to 'Rinkey ny Guilleyn Baney' / 'The White Boys Dance'); a reprint of a short drama collected by John Clague and first published in his Cooinaghtyn Manninagh / Manx Reminiscences ('Shibber Burt Baatey' / 'The Boat Supper'); and an original play in Manx by John Gell ('Oie'll Vreeshey').

Together with The Leighton Stowell Book of Manx Dances (published in 1981), Rinkaghyn Vannin, is a primary source for performers of Manx traditional dance today.

== Dances ==
- Hop tu Naa
- Flitter Dance
- Cur Shaghey yn Geurey
- Helg yn Dreean
- Yn Guilley Hesheree
- Car y Phoosee
- Yn Mheillea
- Peter O’Tavy
- Car ny Rankee
- Hyndaa yn Bwoailley
- Eunysagh Vona
- Illiam y Thalhear
- Jem as Nancy
- The Fathaby Jig
- Car ny Ferrishyn
- Car Juan Nan
- Ben Rein y Voaldyn
- Moirrey ny Cainle
- Moghrey Mie as Maynrys
- Dance For Five
- Purt Cubbley
- Reeaghyn dy Vannin
- Cum yn Shenn Oanrey Cheh
- Shooyl Inneenyn
- Mylecharane's March
- Bwoaill Baccagh
- Lheim y Braddan [description only]
- Rinkey ny Ghuilleyn Baney
