= Hop-tu-Naa =

Celtic festival celebrated in the Isle of Man

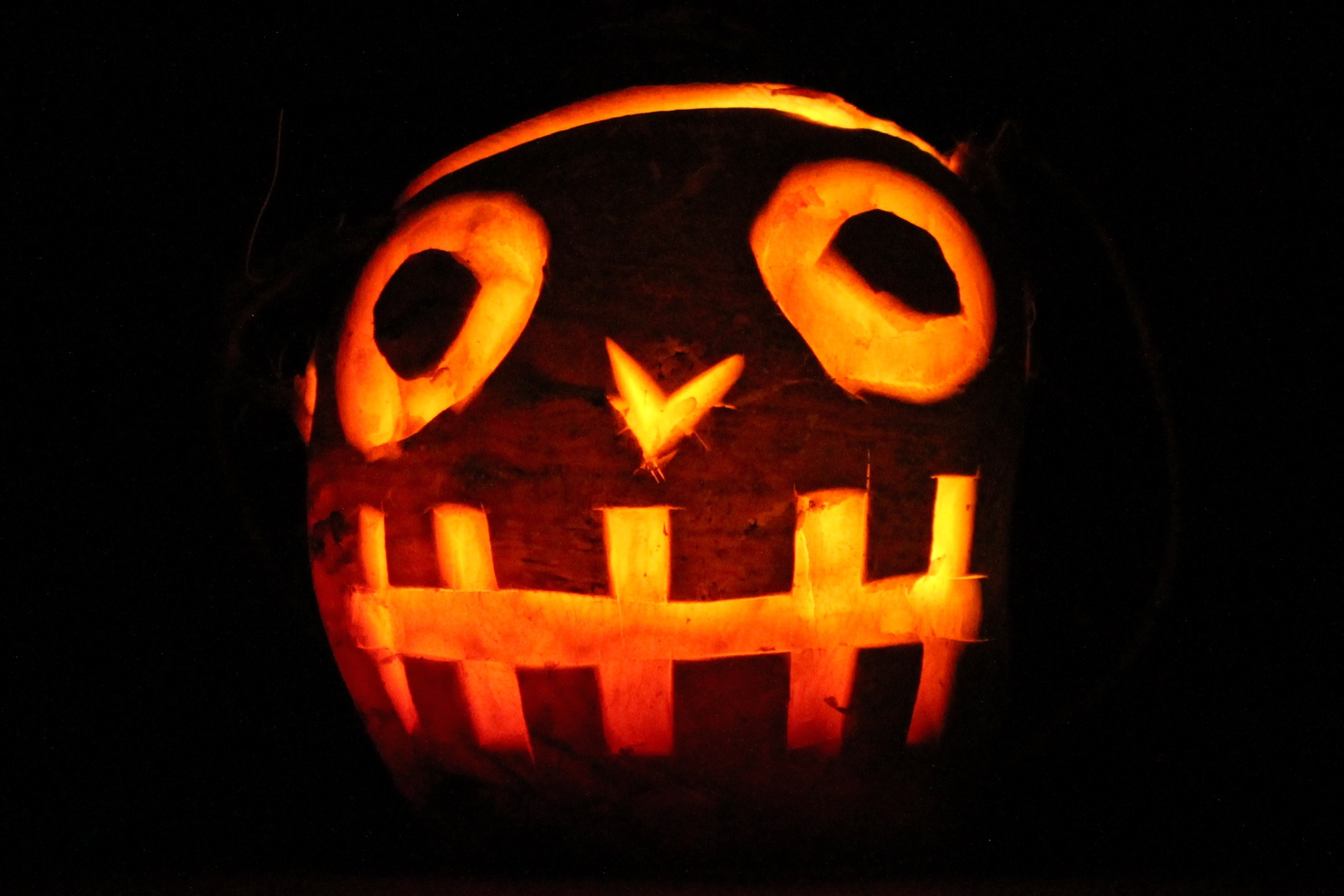
- Observed by: Isle of Man
- Type: Cultural
- Date: October 31
- Frequency: annual

Hop-tu-Naa (/ˌhɒp tjuː ˈneɪ/ HOP tyoo NAY; Manx: Oie Houney; Irish: Oíche Shamhna [ˌiːçə ˈhəunˠə]) is a Celtic festival celebrated in the Isle of Man on 31 October. It is the celebration of the traditional Gaelic festival of Samhain, the start of winter. It is thought to be the oldest unbroken tradition in the Isle of Man. The day's traditions include carving turnip lanterns (similar to the Hallowe'en activity of making jack-o-lanterns), singing and dancing, and divination rituals.

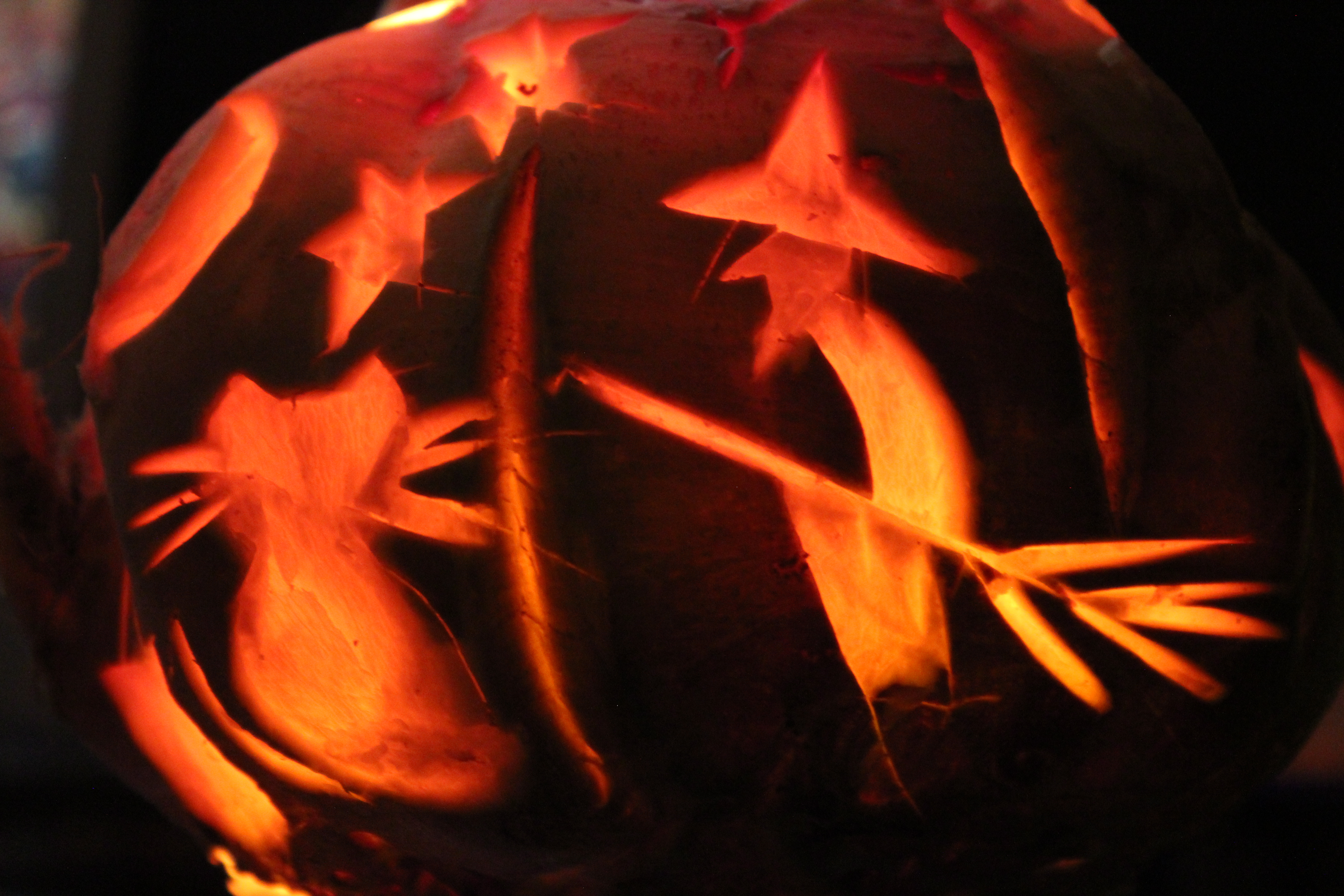
Hop-tu-naa turnip with witch and cat

== Etymology ==
The Manx name Oie Houney corresponds to the Irish Oíche Shamhna, which was pronounced the same (though not in revived Manx). The exact status of Oíche Shamhna and its role in the Celtic calendar has been a matter of debate. Oíche Shamhna eventually mutated into Hallowe'en in northern England and in Ireland, it was carried to America by Irish immigrants and developed into the modern Halloween.

The term Hop-tu-naa comes from a Manx Gaelic song traditionally sung during the festival which included the nonsense Hop-tu-naa as a refrain; such nonsense rhymes are common theme in Irish and Scottish Gaelic music.

== Traditions ==
On the Isle of Man today, many groups of people continue the tradition of singing Hop-tu-Naa songs "around the houses" (which traditionally referred to waits going around visiting houses, especially those of the wealthy, and soliciting gifts; beggars going "around the houses" are featured in The Deemster) with turnip lanterns. In addition to this, many public Hop-tu-Naa events take place across the Isle of Man each year, most of which today include competitions for artistically carving turnips and the singing of traditional songs. As well as the many events run within local communities, the National Folk Museum at Cregneash hosts an event to teach the traditional Hop-tu-Naa song and to help people to carve turnips.

=== Turnip lanterns ===
At the modern Hop-tu-Naa, children dress up and go from house to house hoping to be given sweets or money, as elsewhere. The children carry carved turnip lanterns (which are known as moots by the Manx) and sing Hop-tu-Naa songs. There are regional varieties of how turnips should be carved for Hop-tu-Naa, with variations focusing on which way up the turnip is and the nature of the decorations. It is believed that turnip lanterns do not date earlier than the start of the 19th century, as the vegetable had only been introduced at the end of the previous century. In the past children would bring the stumps of turnips with them and batter the doors of those who refused to give them any money, in an ancient form of trick or treat. This practice appears to have died out.

=== Dancing ===
A Hop-tu-Naa dance was collected by both Mona Douglas and Leighton Stowell. It was believed to have been danced through the streets on Hop-tu-Naa night by couples carrying their turnip-lanterns. It is a simple procession dance for pairs of dancers which involves the Manx reel step and a combination of arches only. This dance is taught in many schools on the Isle of Man during October each year, and it is danced at many of the Hop-tu-Naa events across the island.

=== Divination ===
Some of the older customs are similar to those now attached to the January New Year. It was a time for prophesying, weather prediction and fortune-telling. Last thing at night, the ashes of a fire were smoothed out on the hearth to receive the imprint of a foot. If, next morning, the track pointed towards the door, someone in the house would die, but if the footprint pointed inward, it indicated a birth.

A cake was made which was called Soddag Valloo or Dumb Cake, because it was made and eaten in silence. Young women and girls all had a hand in baking it on the red embers of the hearth, first helping to mix the ingredients (flour, eggs, eggshells, soot and salt) and kneading the dough. The cake was divided up and eaten in silence and, still without speaking, all who had eaten it went to bed, walking backwards, expecting and hoping to see their future husband in a dream or vision. The future husband was expected to appear in the dream and offer a drink of water.

Other means of divination was to steal a salt herring from a neighbour, roast it over the fire, eat it in silence and retire to bed; or to hold water in your mouth and a pinch of salt in each hand as you listen to a neighbour's conversation, whereupon the first name mentioned would be that of your future spouse.

=== Traditional foods ===
Traditional food for Hop-tu-Naa includes mrastyr: potatoes, parsnips and fish mashed up with butter. Any leftovers from this evening meal would be left out with crocks of fresh water for the fairies. Toffee would also be made, with just sugar and water, as a communal activity on the evening of Hop-tu-Naa.

== Songs ==
=== The Hop-tu-Naa Song ===
Hop-tu-Naa (as collected by A. W. Moore)	English translation	Hop! Ta'n Oie (as collected by Dr. John Clague)	English translation
Shoh shenn oie Houiney; Hop-tu-naa	This is old Sauin night; Hop-tu-naa	Hop! ta'n oie. Noght oie Houney	Hop! ta'n oie. To-night is Hollantide Night.
T'an eayst soilshean; Trol-la-laa.	The moon shines bright; Trol-la-laa.	Hop! ta'n oie. Mairagh Laa Houney.	Hop! ta'n oie. To-morrow is Hollantide Day.
Kellagh ny kiarkyn; Hop-tu-naa.	Cock of the hens; Hop-tu-naa	Hop! ta'n oie. Kellagh as kiark.	Hop! ta'n oie. Cock and hen.
Shibber ny gauin; Trol-la-laa.	Supper of the heifer; Trol-la-laa.	Hop! ta'n oie. Shibbyr y gounee.	Hop! ta'n oie. Supper of the heifer.
'Cre'n gauin marr mayd? Hop-tu-naa.	Which heifer shall we kill? Hop-tu-naa	Hop! ta'n oie. Cre'n gauin gow mayd?	Hop! ta'n oie. What heifer shall we take?
Yn gauin veg vreac. Trol-la-laa.	The little speckled heifer. Trol-la-laa.	Hop! ta'n oie. Yn gauin beg breck.	Hop! ta’n oie. The little spotted heifer.
Yn chione kerroo, Hop-tu-naa.	The fore-quarter, Hop-tu-naa	Hop! ta'n oie. Kerroo ayns y phot.	Hop! ta'n oie. Quarter in the pot.
Ver mayd 'sy phot diu; Trol-la-laa.	We'll put in the pot for you. Trol-la-laa.	Hop! ta'n oie. Vlayst mee yn vroit.	Hop! ta'n oie. I tasted the broth.
Yn kerroo veg cooyl, Hop-tu-naa.	The little hind quarter, Hop-tu-naa	Hop! ta'n oie. Scold mee my scoarnagh.	Hop! ta'n oie. I scalded my throat.
Cur dooin, cur dooin. Trol-la-laa.	Give to us, give to us. Trol-la-laa.	Hop! ta'n oie. Roie mee gys y chibbyr.	Hop! ta'n oie. I ran to the well.
Hayst mee yn anvroie, Hop-tu-naa.	I tasted the broth, Hop-tu-naa	Hop! ta'n oie. Diu mee my haie.	Hop! ta'n oie. I drank my fill.
Scoald mee my hengey, Trol-la-laa.	I scalded my tongue, Trol-la-laa.	Hop! ta'n oie. Eisht cheet ny yel.	Hop! ta'n oie. Then coming back.
Ro'e mee gys y chibber, Hop-tu-naa.	I ran to the well, Hop-tu-naa	Hop! ta'n oie. Veeit mee poul kayt.	Hop! ta'n oie. I met a pole-cat. (Note: The wild European polecat (Mustela putorius) is not found on Man; the animal referred to is a feral ferret (Mustela furo).)
As diu mee my haie, Trol-la-laa.	And drank my fill; Trol-la-laa.	Hop! ta'n oie. Ren eh scryssey	Hop! ta'n oie. He grinned.
Er my raad thie, Hop-tu-naa.	On my way back, Hop-tu-naa	Hop! ta'n oie. Ren mee roie.	Hop! ta'n oie. I ran.
Veeit mee kayt-vuitsh; Trol-la-laa.	I met a witch cat; Trol-la-laa.	Hop! ta'n oie. Roie mee gys Nalbin.	Hop! ta'n oie. I ran to Scotland.
Va yn chayt-scryssey, Hop-tu-naa.	The cat began to grin, Hop-tu-naa	Hop! ta'n oie. Cre naight ayns shen?	Hop! ta'n oie. What news there?
As ren mee roie ersooyl. Trol-la-laa.	And I ran away. Trol-la-laa.	Hop! ta'n oie. Yn cheeaght va traaue.	Hop! ta'n oie. The plough was ploughing.
Cre'n raad ren oo roie Hop-tu-naa.	Where did you run to? Hop-tu-naa	Hop! ta'n oie. Ny cleain va cleiee.	Hop! ta'n oie. The harrows were harrowing.
Roie mee gys Albin. Trol-la-laa.	I ran to Scotland. Trol-la-laa.	Hop! ta'n oie. Va ben aeg giarey caashey.	Hop! ta'n oie. A young woman was cutting cheese.
Cred v'ad jannoo ayns shen? Hop-tu-naa	What were they doing there? Hop-tu-naa	Hop! ta'n oie. Yn skynn va geyre.	Hop! ta'n oie. The knife was sharp.
Fuinney bonnagyn as rostey sthalgyn. Trol-la-laa.	Baking bannocks and roasting collops. Trol-la-laa.	Hop! ta'n oie. Yiare ee e mair.	Hop! ta'n oie. She cut her finger.
Hop-tu-naa, Trol-la-laa.	Hop-tu-naa, Trol-la-laa	Hop! ta'n ok. Lhap ee 'sy clooid.	Hop! ta'n oie. She wrapped it in a cloth.
		Hop! ta'n oie. Ghlass ee eh 'sy choir.	Hop! ta'n oie. She locked it in a chest.
		Hop! ta'n oie. Ren eh sthock as stoyr.	Hop! ta'n oie. It made stock and store.
		Hop! ta'n oie. Three kirree keeir.	Hop! ta'n oie. Three brown sheep
		Hop! ta'n oie. Va ec Illiam yn Oe.	Hop! ta'n oie. Had William the grandson.
(Loayrt)	(Spoken)	(Loayrt)	(Spoken)
My ta shiu goll dy chur red erbee dooin,	If you are going to give us anything,	My ta shiu cur veg dou,	If you give me anything,
Cur dooin tappee eh	Give it us soon,	Cur eh dou nish	Give it me soon,
Ny vees mayd ersooyl	Or we'll be away	Son ta mish laccal goll thie	For I want to go home
liorish soilshey yn cayst [sic]	by the light of the moon.	Lesh soilshey yn eayst. Hop! ta'n oie.	With the light of the moon.
Hop-tu-naa, Trol-la-laa	Hop-tu-naa, Trol-la-laa	Hop! ta'n oie.	Hop! ta'n oie.

=== Modern Hop-tu-Naa songs ===
Different versions of Hop-tu-naa songs were sung in different areas of the island.

"Jinnie the Witch" is a modern Manx English song, which was sung around the Douglas area.

According to Hampton Creer, Jinny's real name was Joney Lowney. She lived in Braddan and was tried at Bishop's Court for witchcraft in 1715 and 1716. Her greatest "crime" was stopping the Ballaughton Corn Mill. She was sentenced to 14 days' imprisonment, fined £3 and made to stand at the four market crosses dressed in sackcloth.

The modern song goes as follows:

Hop-tu-Naa
My mother's gone away
And she won't be back until the morning

Jinnie the Witch flew over the house
To fetch the stick to lather the mouse

Hop-tu-Naa
My mother's gone away
And she won't be back until the morning

Hop-tu-Naa, Traa-la-laa

In the west of the island a longer version was sung, which is more closely related to the Manx version.

The following version dates from the 1930s – a similar version is recorded in "A Vocabulary of the Anglo-Manx Dialect" by A. W. Moore, Sophia Morrison and Edmund Goodwin (1924):

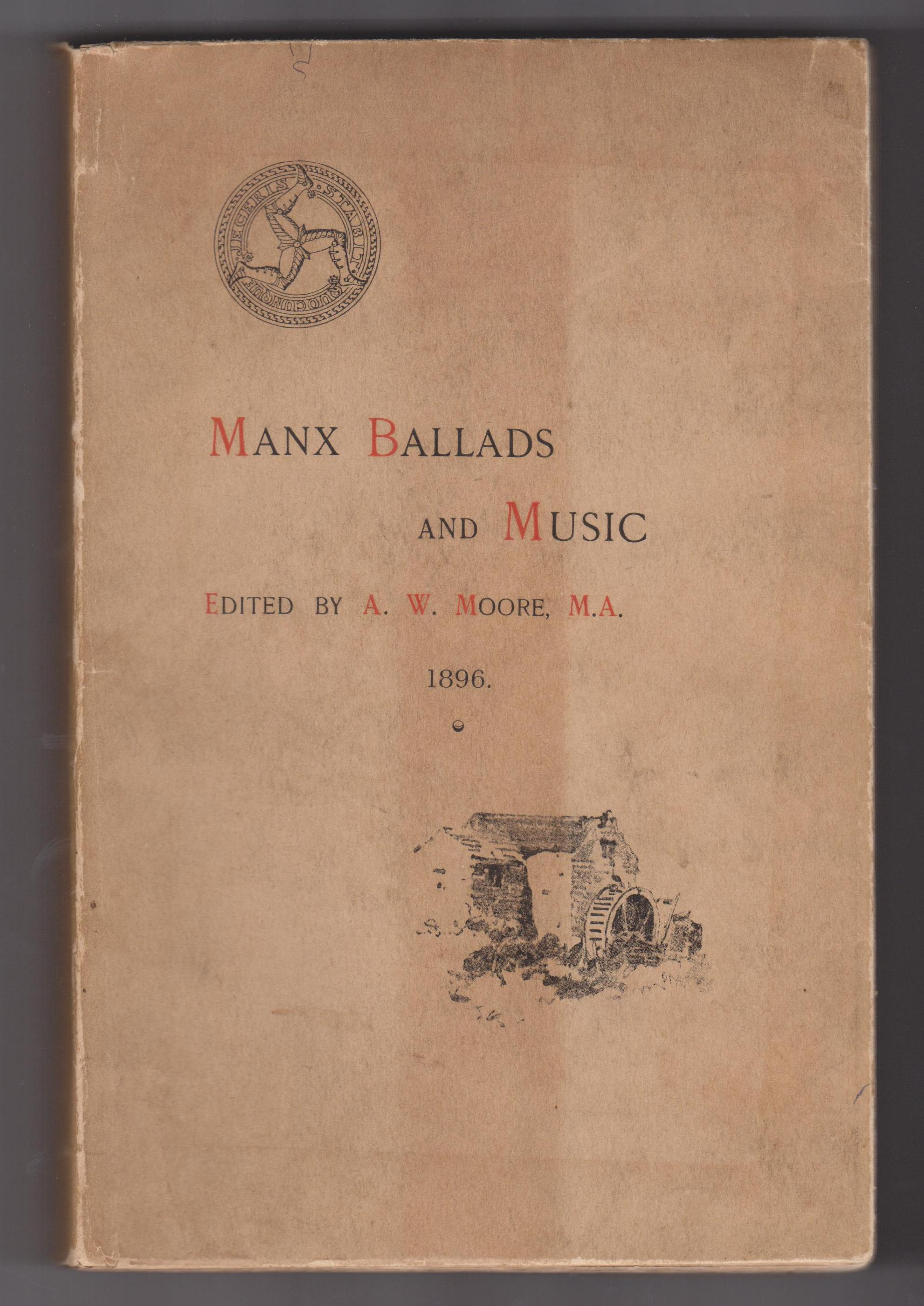
Manx Ballads and Music by A. W. Moore; the earliest book published featuring the Hop-tu-naa song and music

Hop-tu-naa! put in the pot
Hop-tu-naa! put in the pan
Hop-tu-naa! I burnt me throt (throat)
Hop-tu-naa! guess where I ran?
Hop-tu-naa! I ran to the well
Hop-tu-naa! and drank my fill
Hop-tu-naa! and on the way back
Hop-tu-naa! I met a witch cat
Hop-tu-naa! the cat began to grin
Hop-tu-naa! and I began to run
Hop-tu-naa! I ran to Ronague
Hop-tu-naa! guess what I saw there?
Hop-tu-naa! I saw an old woman
Hop-tu-naa! baking bonnags
Hop-tu-naa! roasting sconnags
Hop-tu-naa! I asked her for a bit
Hop-tu-naa! she gave me a bit
as big as me big toe
Hop-tu-naa! she dipped it in milk
Hop-tu-naa! she wrapped it in silk
Hop-tu-naa! Traa la lay!
If you're going to give us anything, give it to us soon
before we run away with the light of the moon!

The 1970s southern version from Castletown includes the mention of the Witches Mill, the Smelt Monument and the Old House of Keys:

This is auld hollantide night, the moon shines clear and bright
Hop-tu-naa, traa-la-laa
Jinnie the witch jumped over the college to fetch the stick to stir the porridge
Hop-tu-naa, traa-la-laa
Castletown square is mighty bare, there isn't a statue that should have been there
Hop-tu-naa, traa-la-laa
The castle is grey, and Parliament gone, the harbour is quiet no smugglers run
Hop-tu-naa, traa-la-laa

When lights were turned out and no sweets were given, there was a further chorus:

This is old hollantide night, the moon is shining bright
if you're going to bring us money
You better bring it quick
as we may start to sing again, and your neighbours will think you're thick
Hop-tu-naa, traa-la-laa
Jinnie the witch is over the mill if you don't give us something quick
she will come and get you.

New songs for Hop-tu-Naa continue to be created, the most notable of which was written by Scaanjoon in 2015, having been commissioned by Culture Vannin. This has been taken up by the Manx traditional music youth group, Bree, as a part of their repertoire.

== Images of carved hop-tu-naa turnips ==
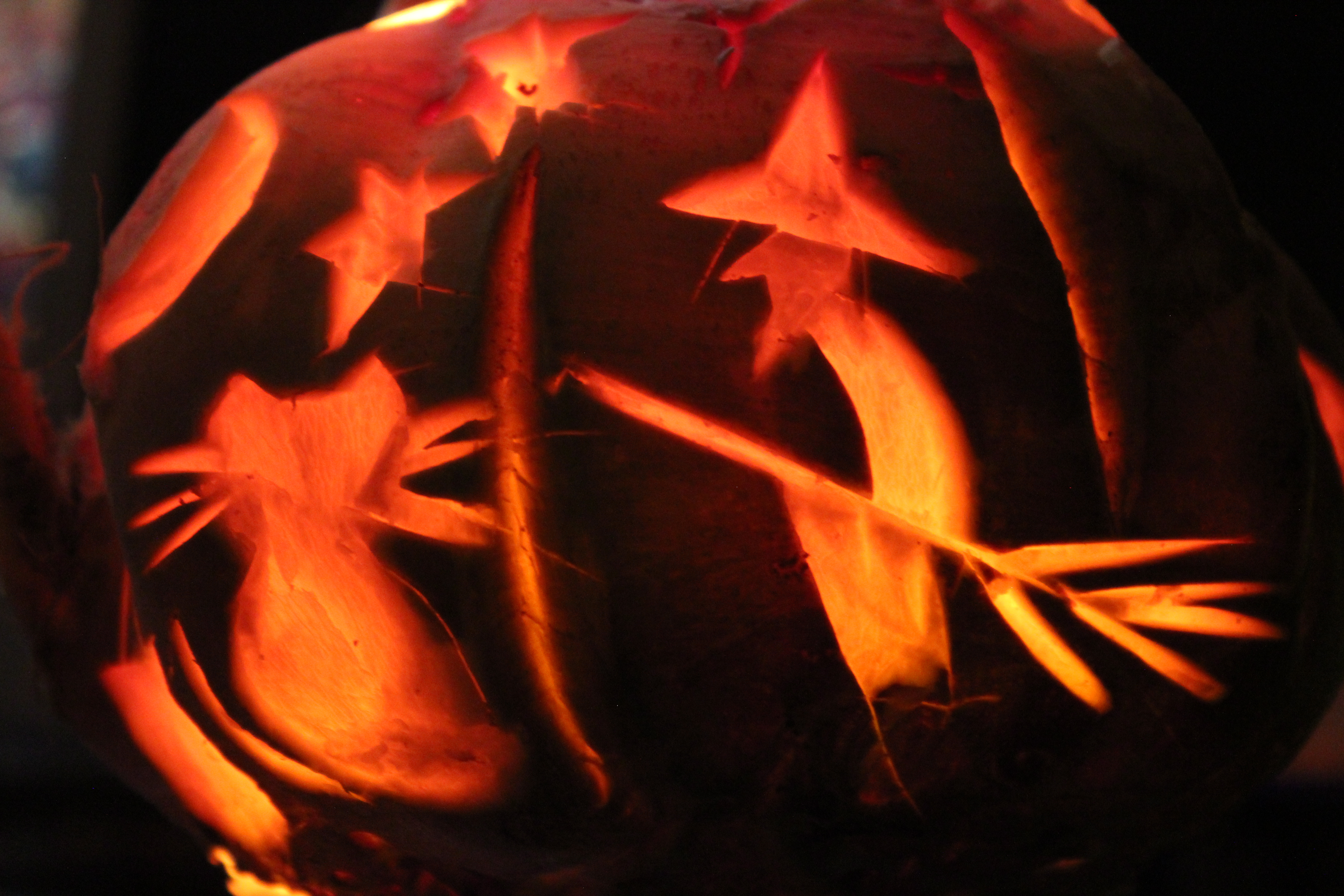

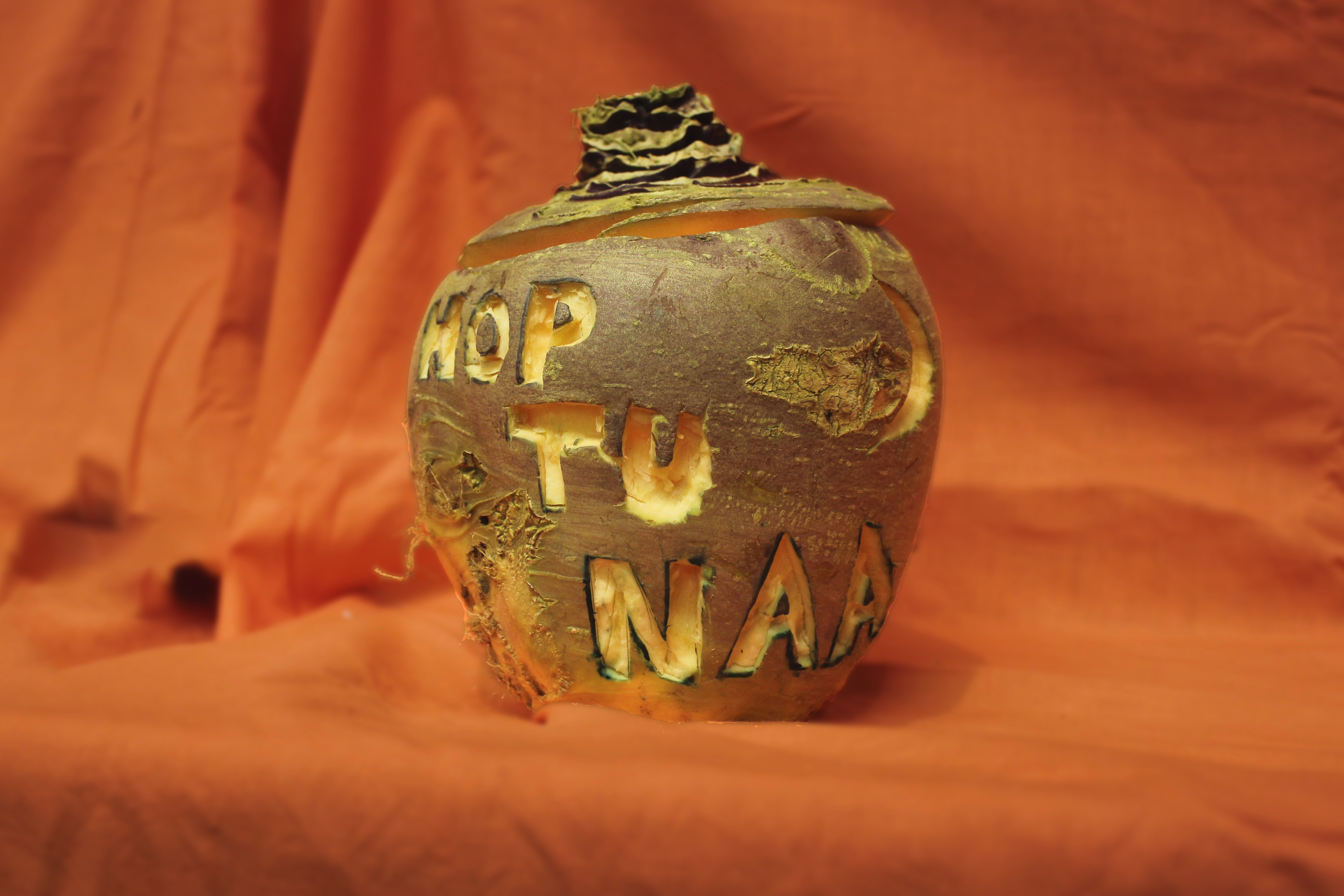

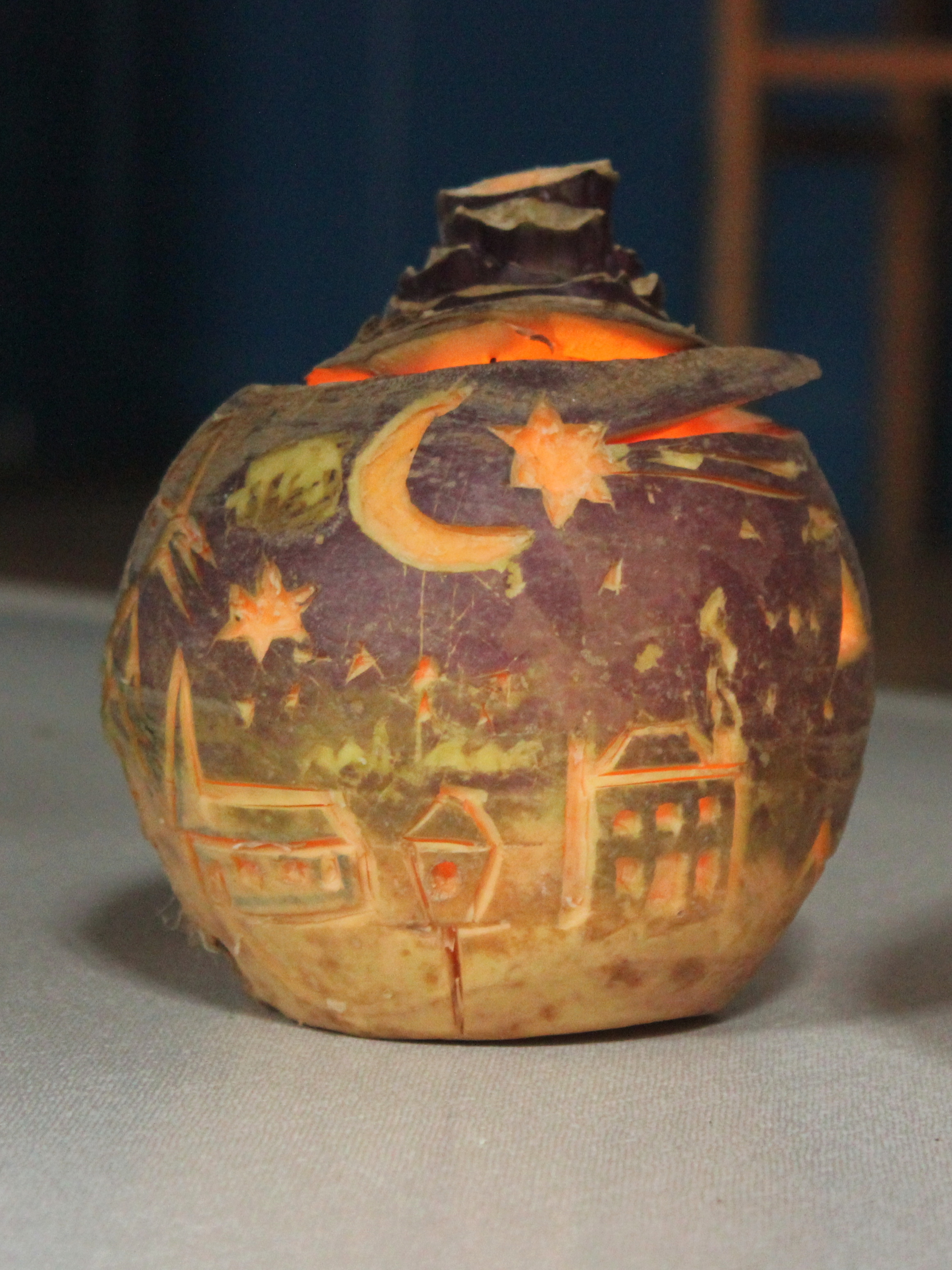

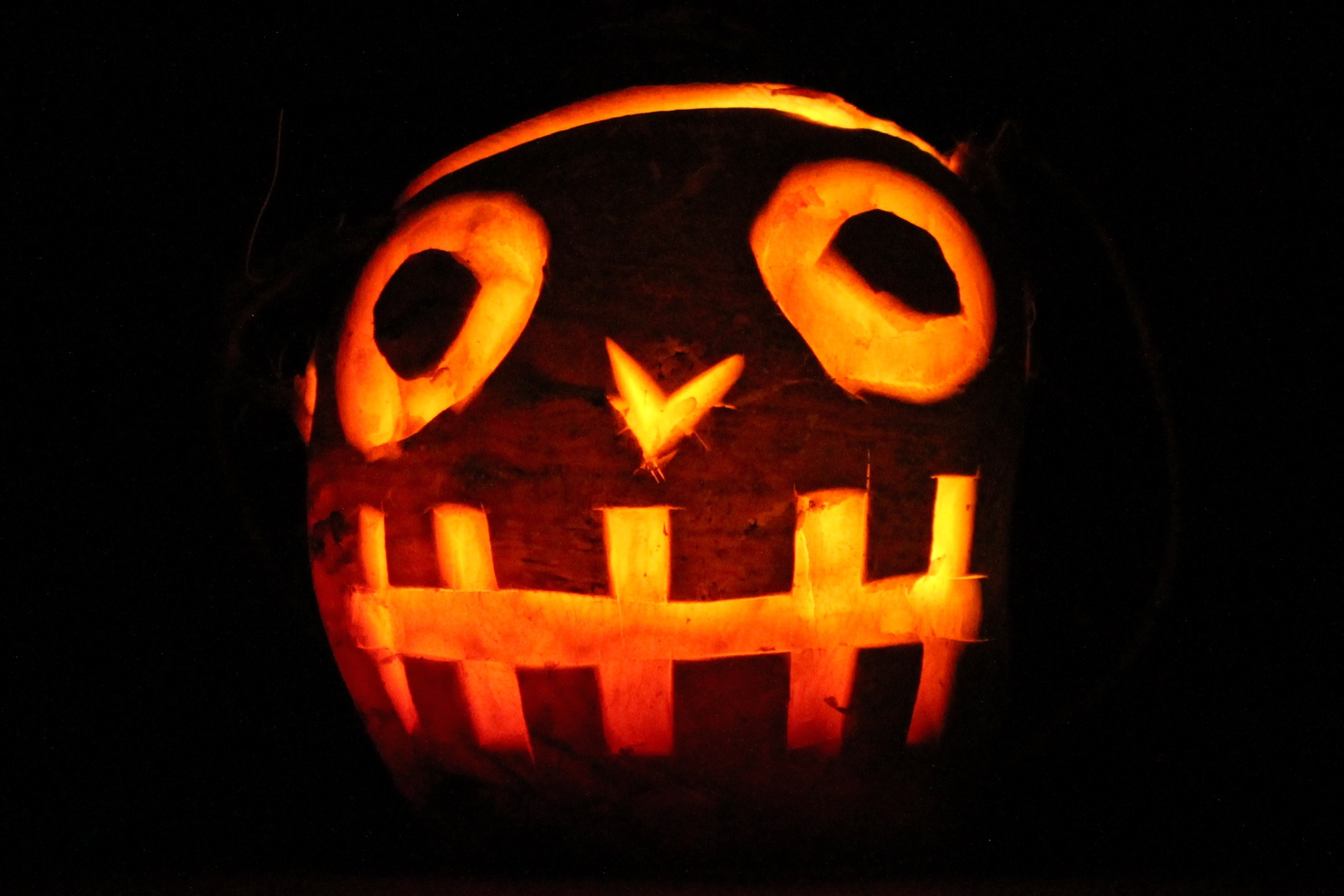

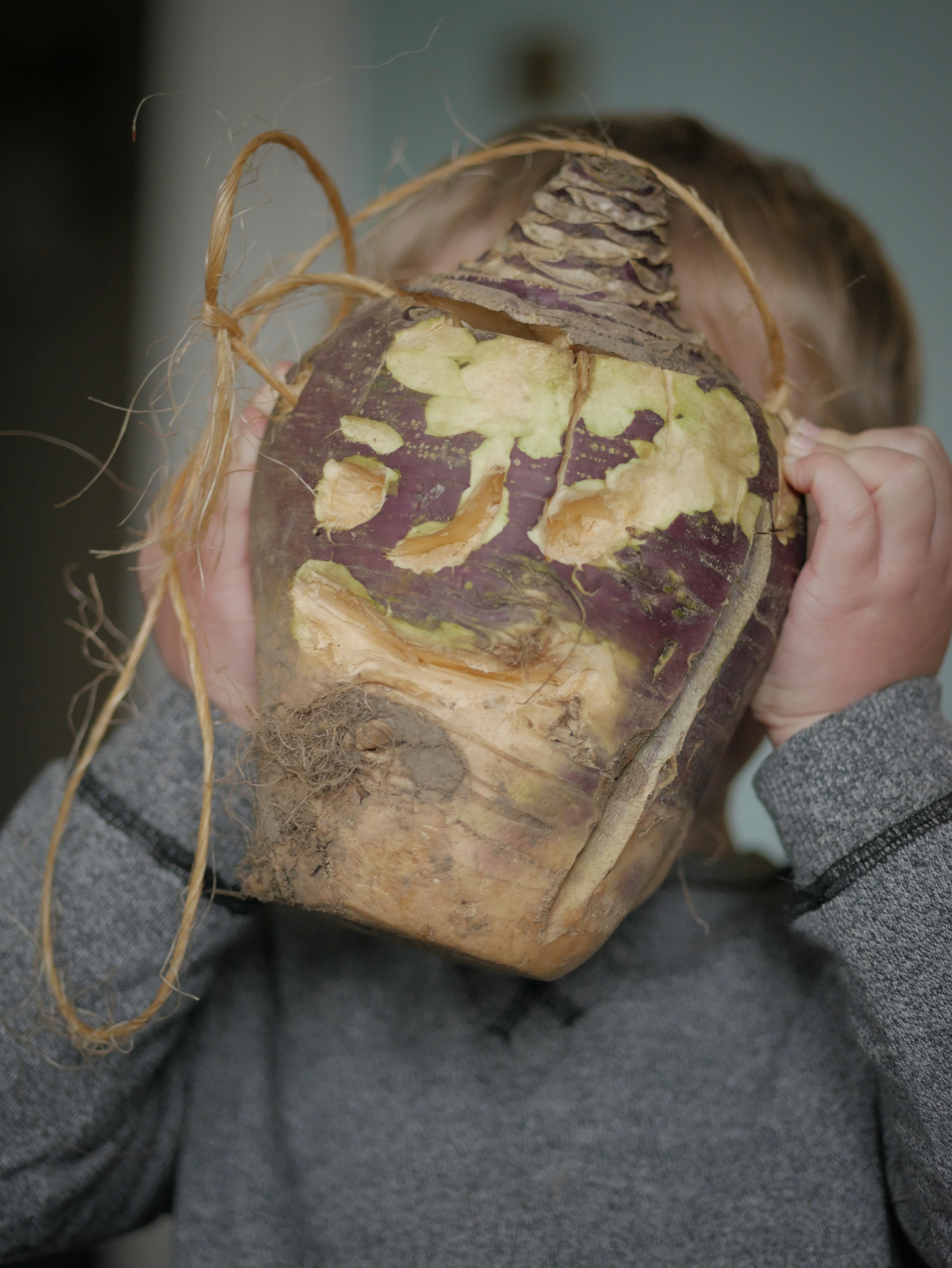

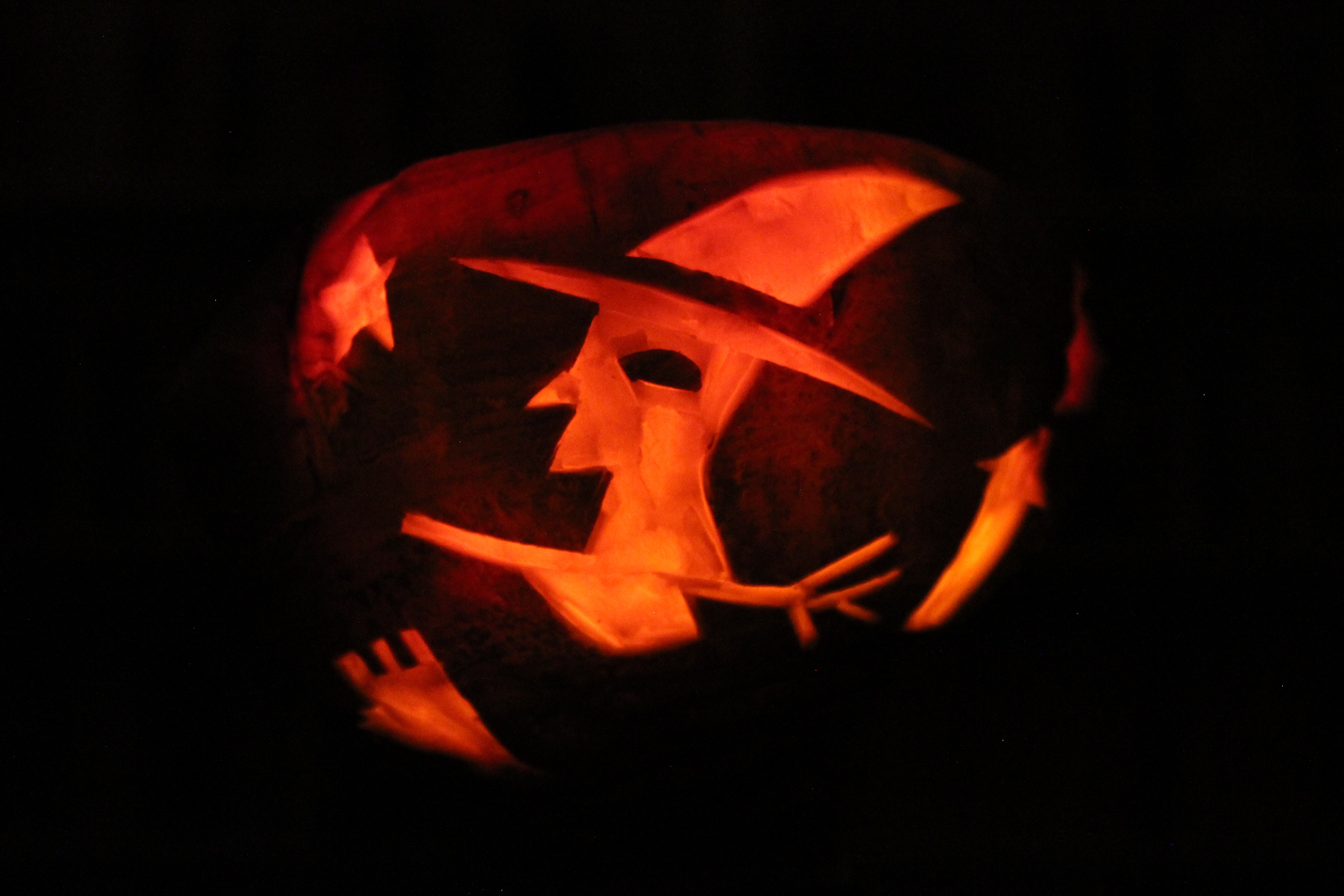

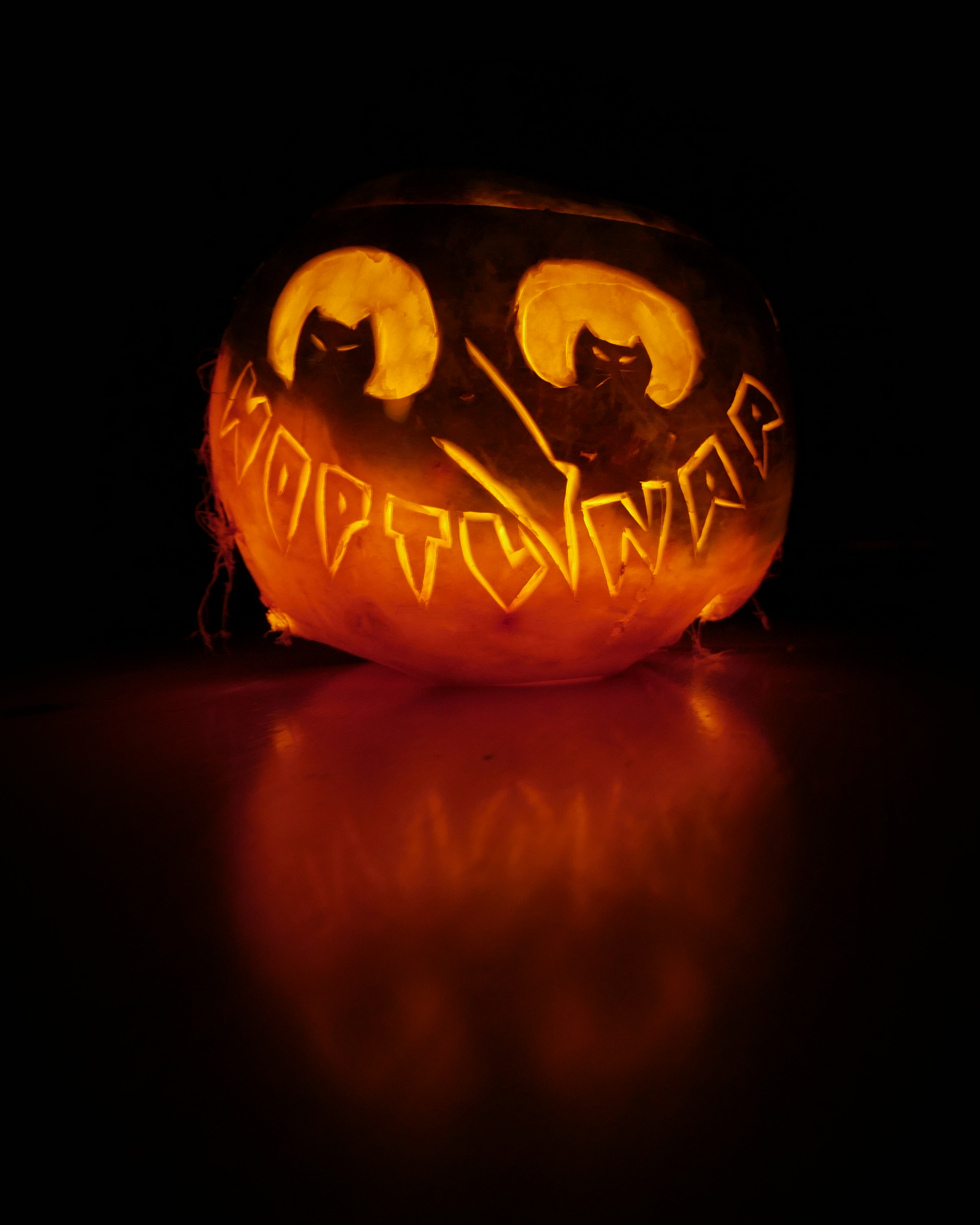

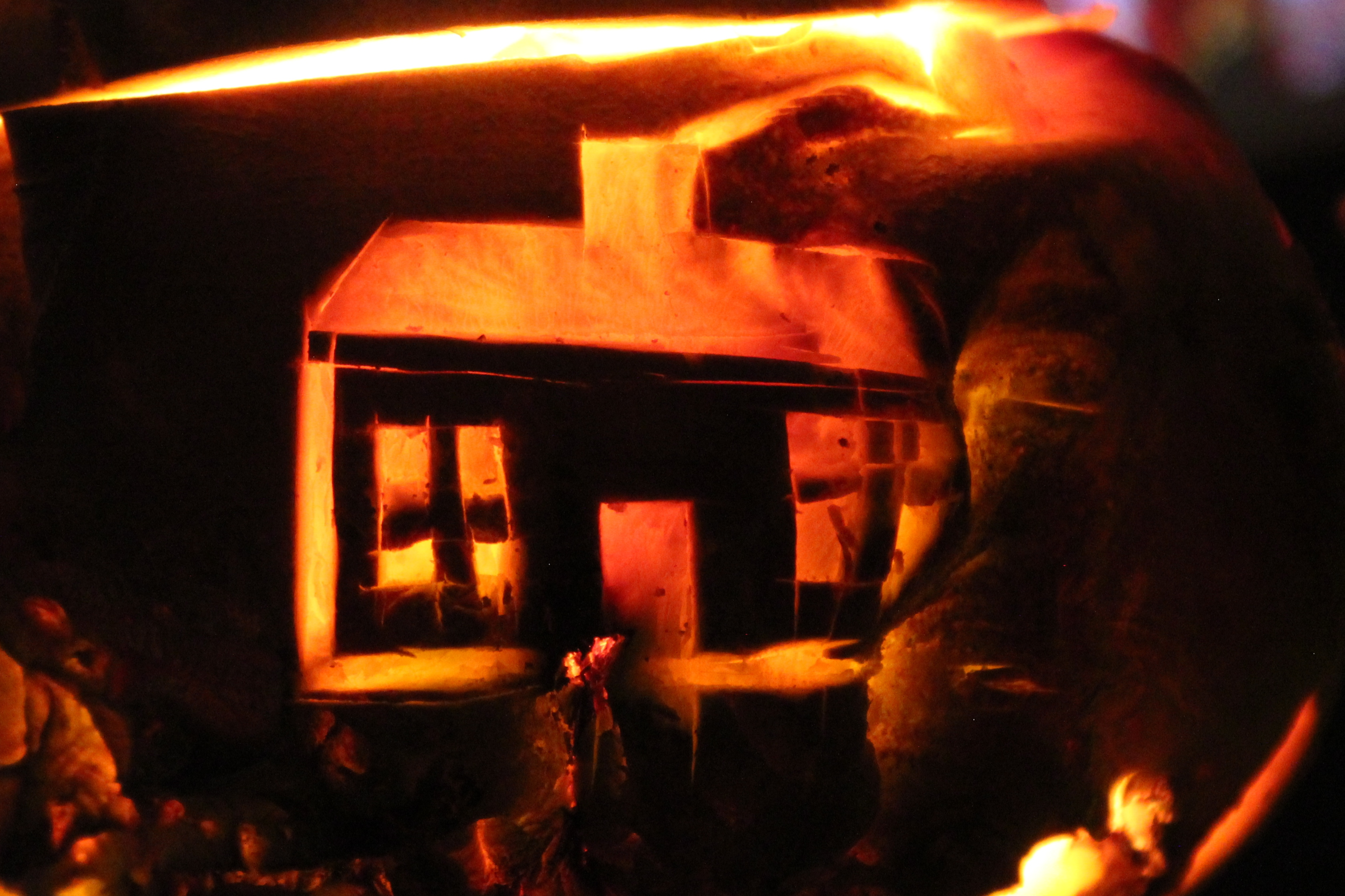

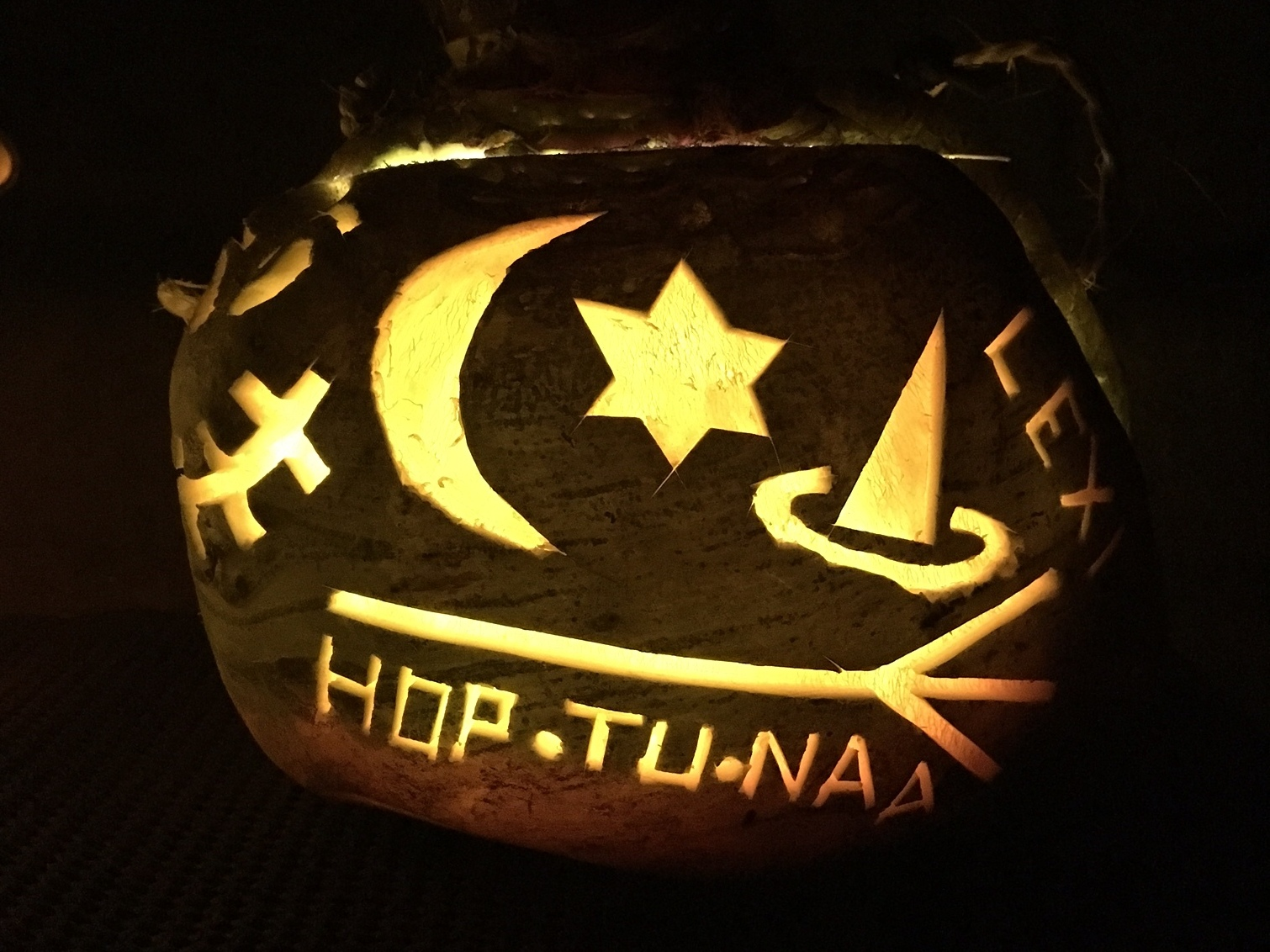

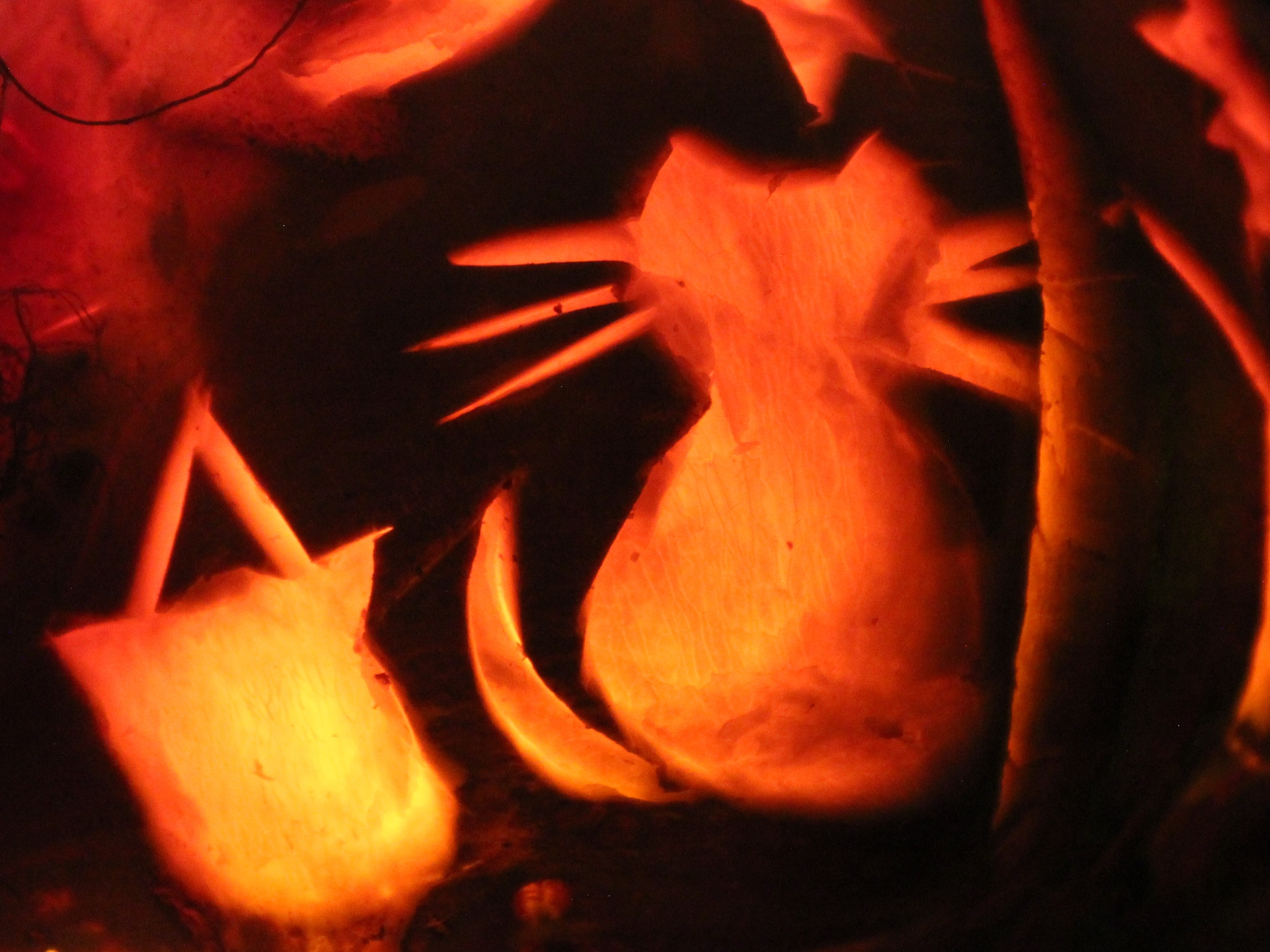

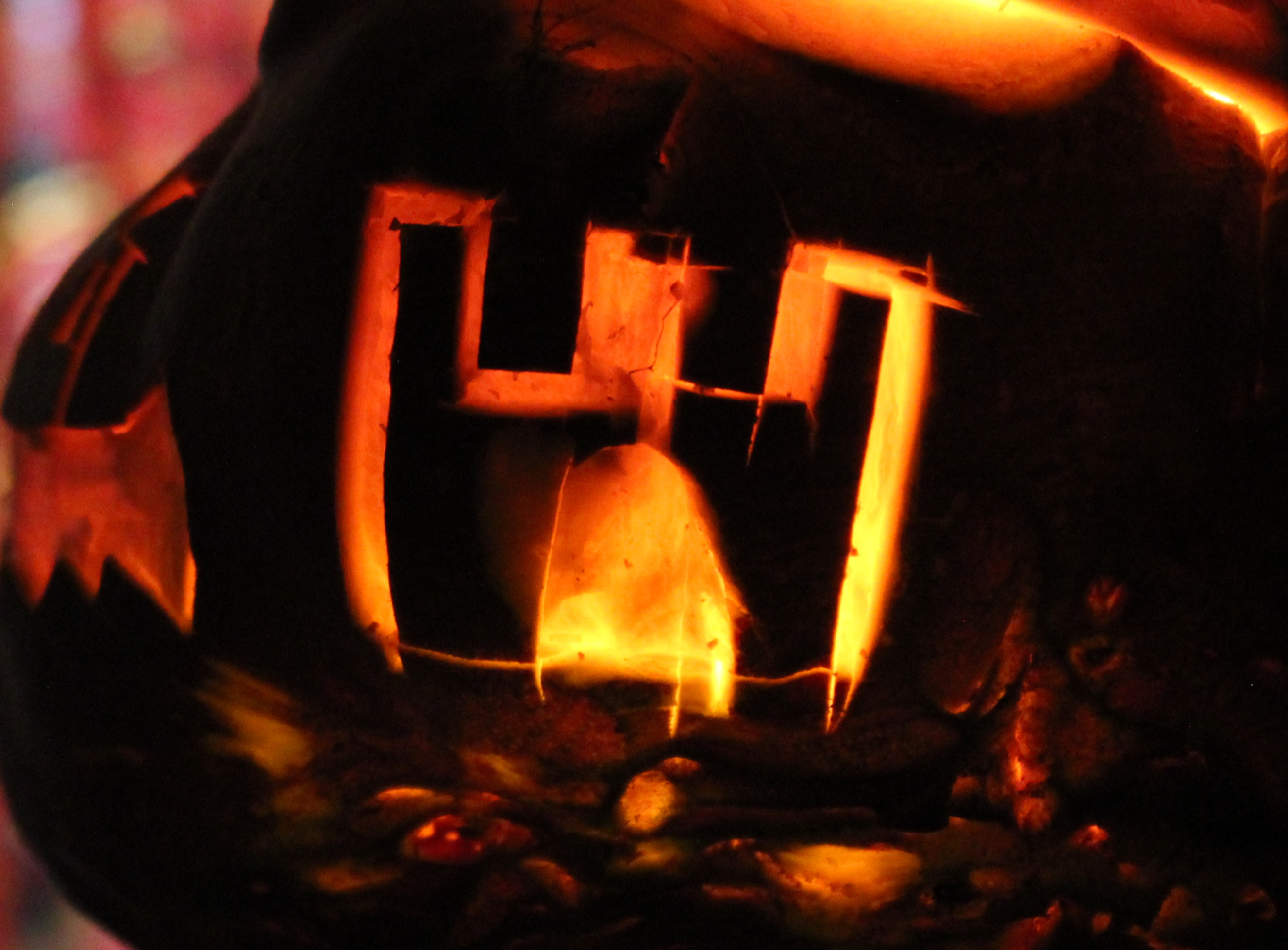

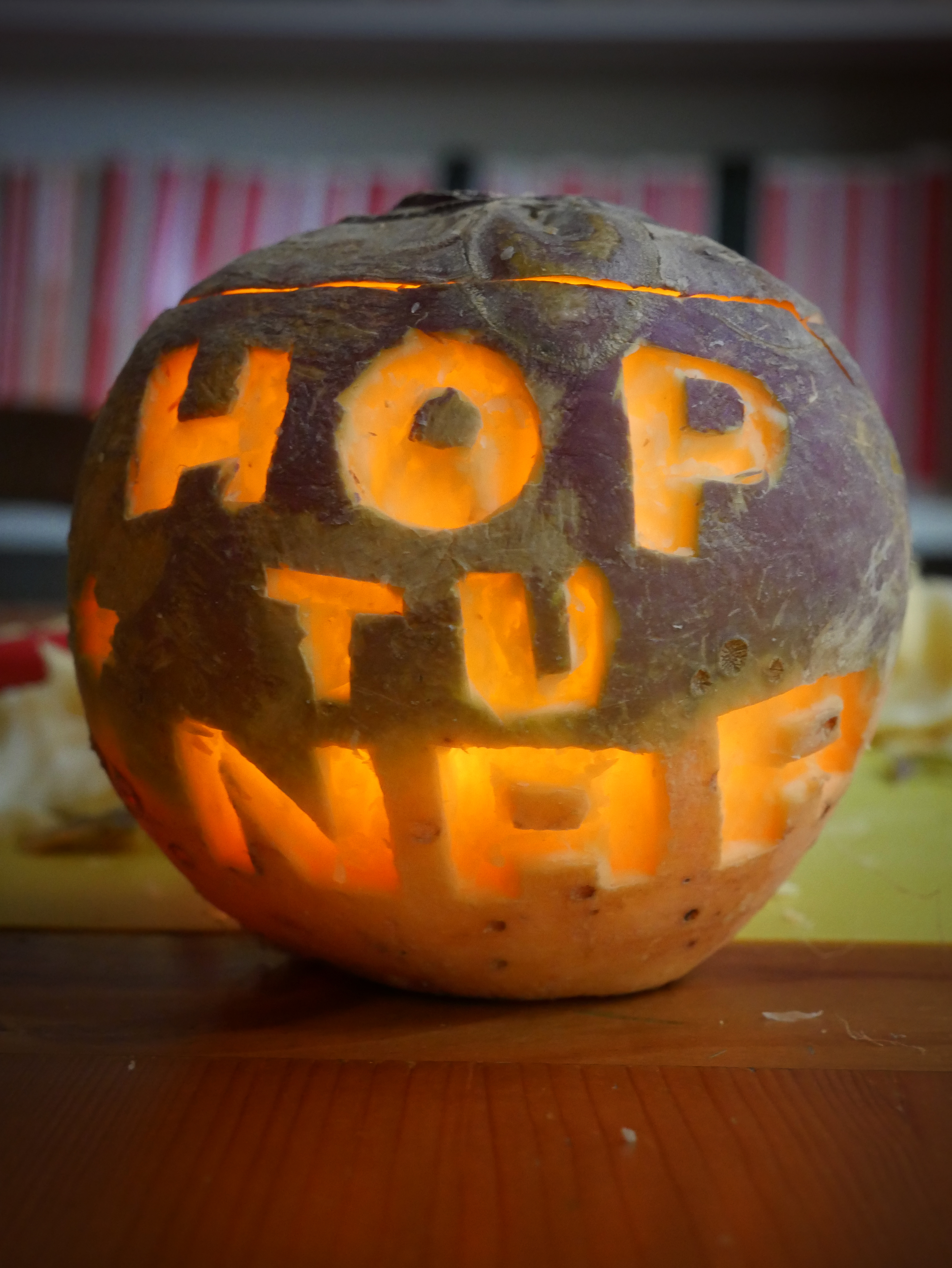

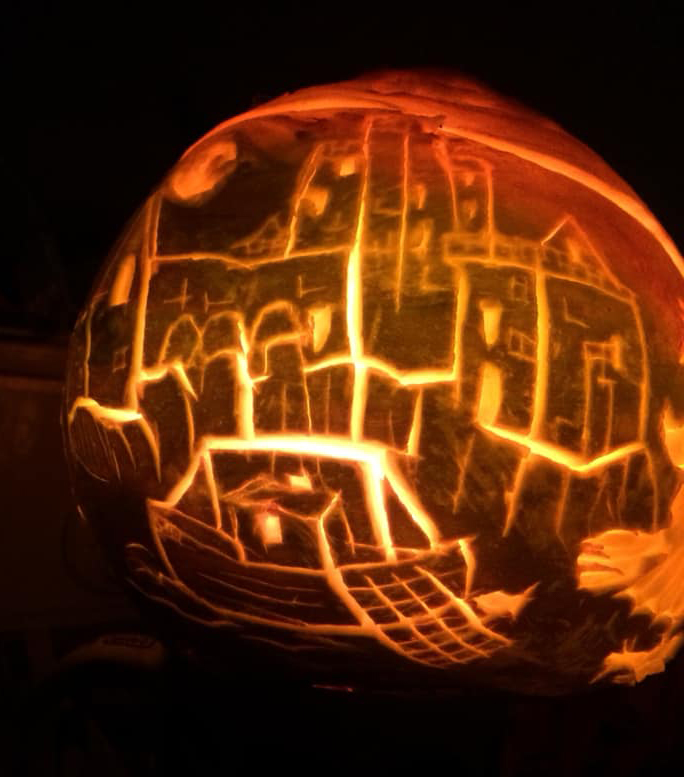

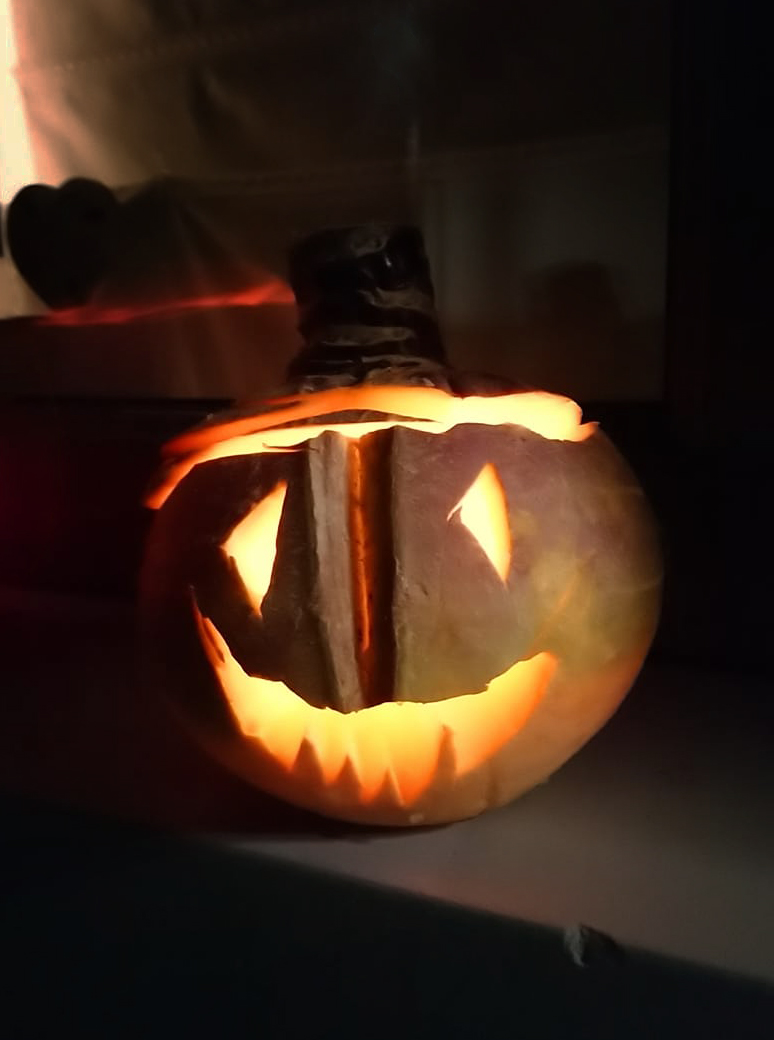

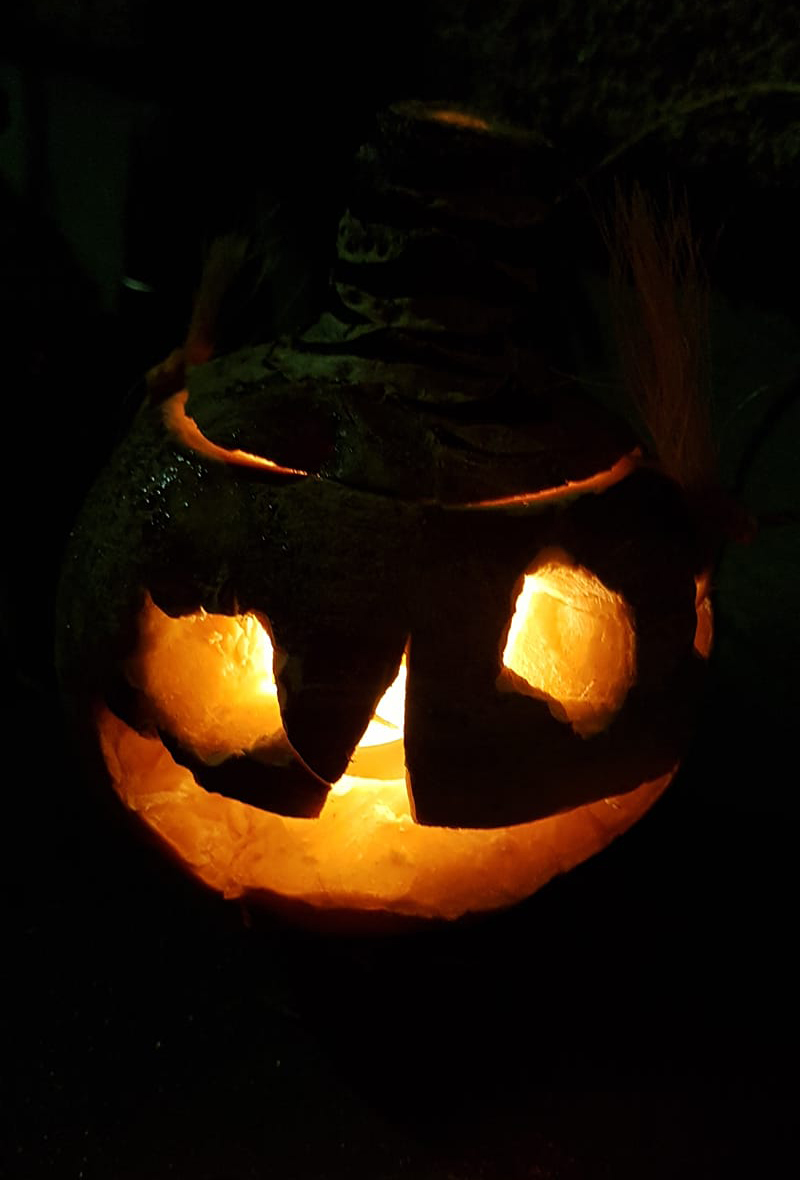

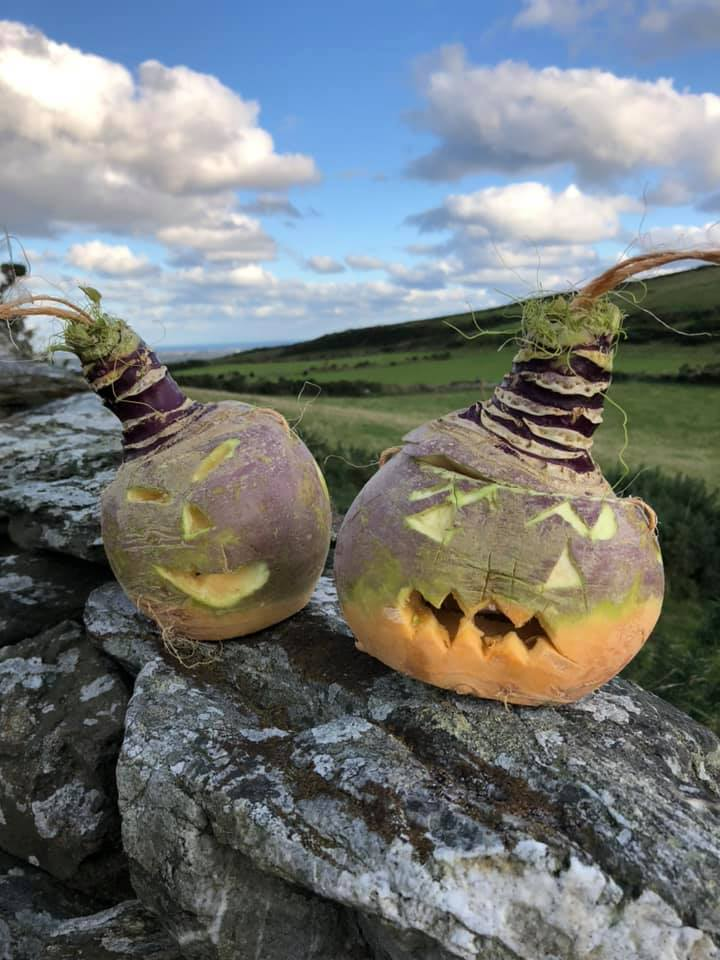

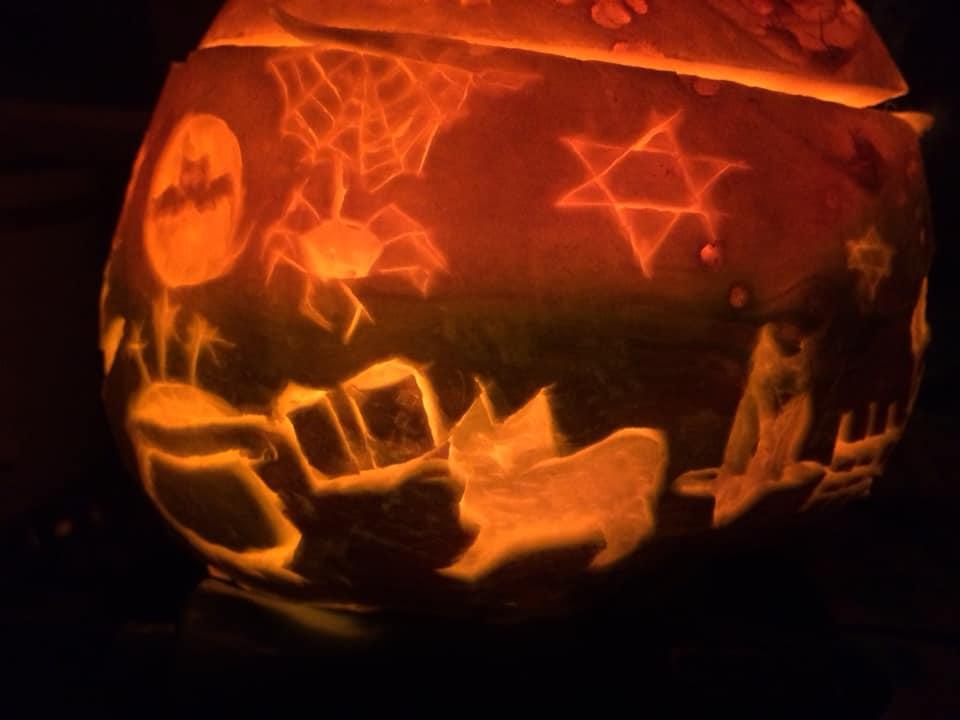

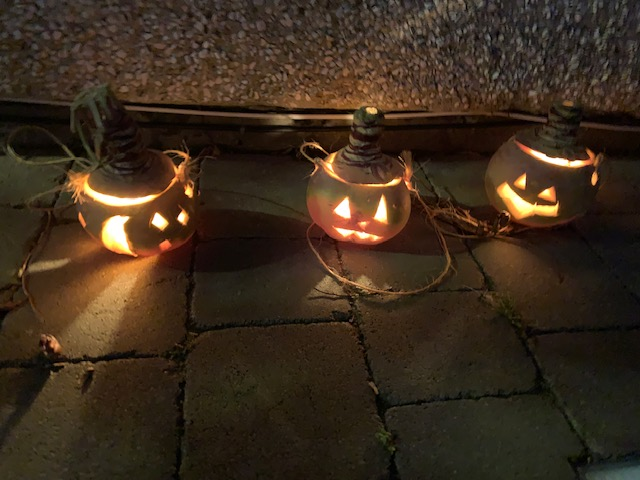

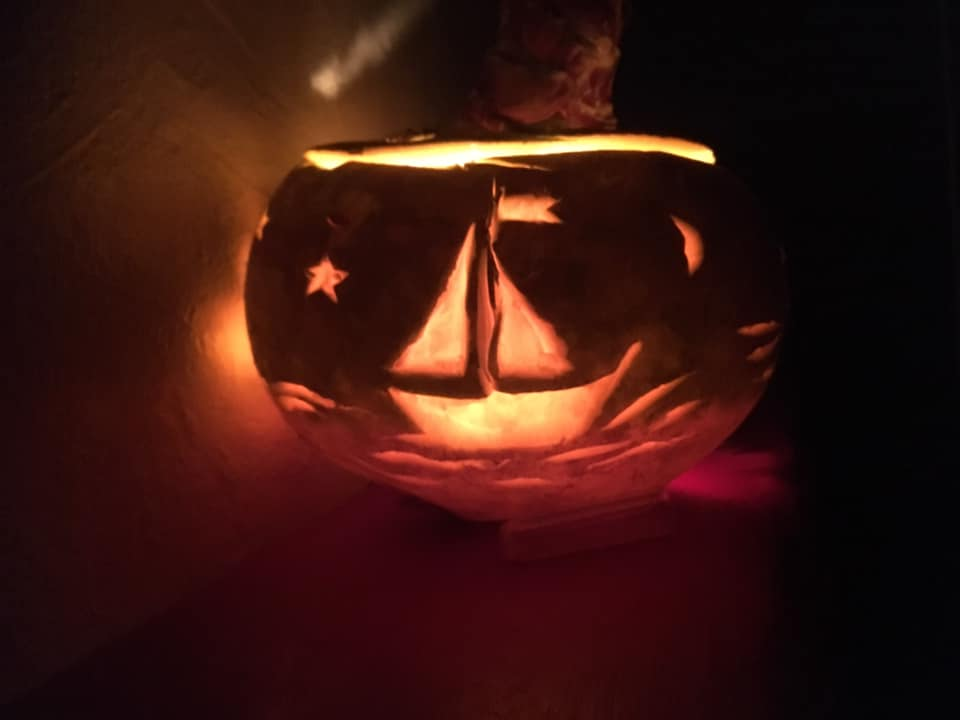

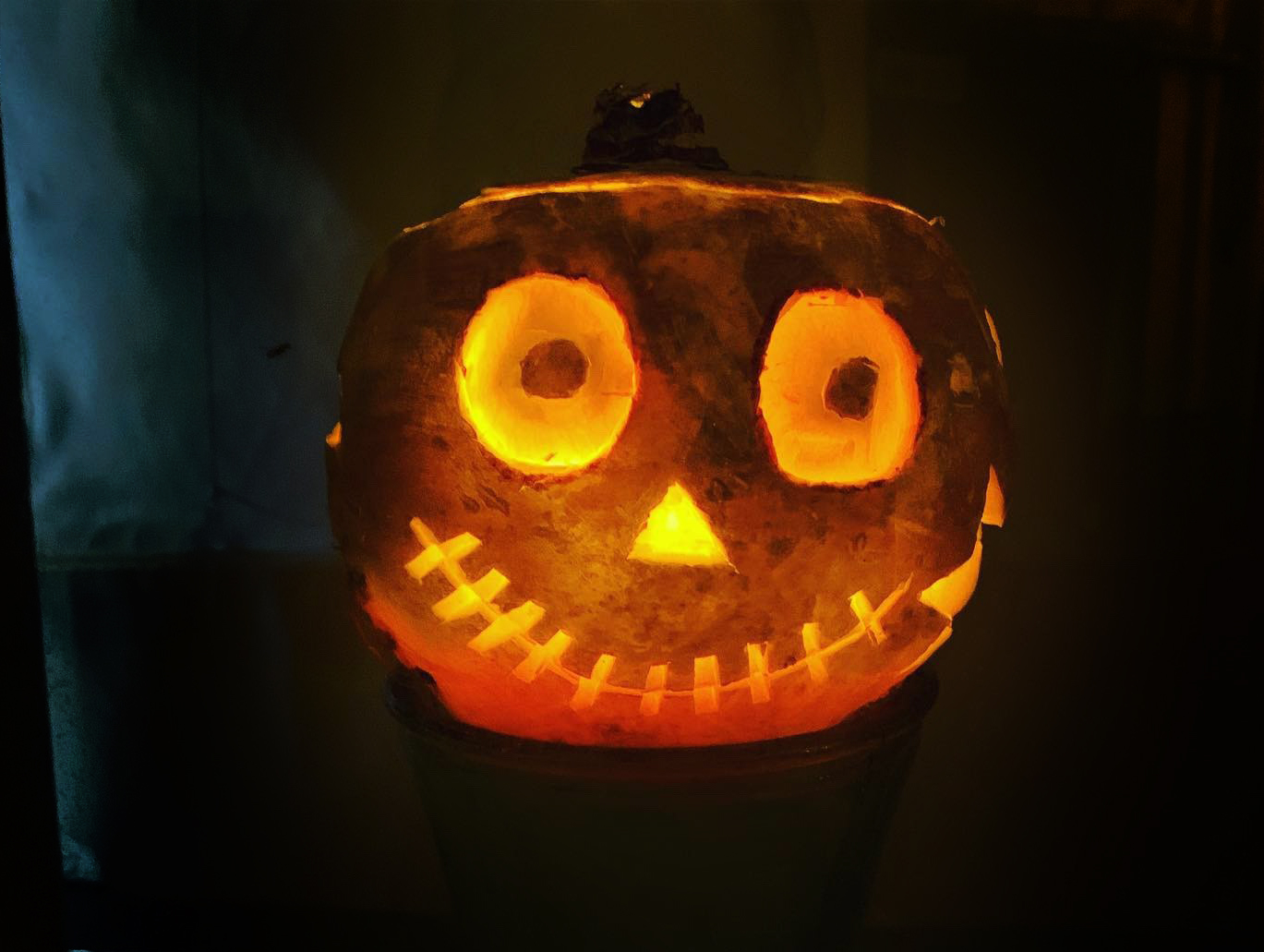

== See also ==
- Allantide
- Calan Gaeaf
- Guising
- Halloween
- Hogmanay
- Samhain
