= List of acts of Tynwald =

This is an incomplete list of acts of Tynwald, made by Tynwald, the parliament of the Isle of Man.

== 15th century ==
Short title, or popular name	Citation	Royal assent
Long title
Customary Laws Act 1417	AT 1 of 1417	
An Act [concerning Coroner’s Arrest.]
Customary Laws Act 1422	AT 1 of 1422	
An Act [concerning customary laws.]

== 16th century ==
Short title, or popular name	Citation	Royal assent
Long title
Churchwardens Ordinance	AT 1 of 1577	
Customary Laws Act 1577	AT 2 of 1577	
Treasure Trove Act 1586 (repealed)	AT 1 of 1586	
An Act [about treasure trove.]

== 17th century ==
Short title, or popular name	Citation	Royal assent
Long title
Land Law Act 1645	AT 1 of 1645	25 June 1645
An Act [providing for the payment of rent in respect of land held of the Lord of Man, and for re-entry in the case of non-payment]

== 18th century ==
Short title, or popular name	Citation	Royal assent
Long title
Act of Settlement 1704	AT 1 of 1704	
An Act for the perfect Settleing and Confirmation of the Estates, Tenures, Fines, Rents, Suits, and Services of the Tennants of the Right Honourable James Earl of Derby, within his Isle of Man.
Act of Settlement (Further Provisions) Act 1704	AT 2 of 1704	6 June 1704
Trespass Act 1705	AT 1 of 1705	25 June 1705
An Act against Trespassing.
Criminal Law Act 1736	AT 1 of 1736	12 August 1736
An Act concerning the criminal law.
Fraudulent Assignments Act 1736	AT 2 of 1736	11 August 1736
An Act [about fraudulent assignments and transfers by debtors.]
Markets Act 1736	AT 3 of 1736	12 August 1736
An Act [about markets]
Gregorian Calendar Act 1753	AT 1 of 1753	31 March 1753
An Act for regulating the Commencement of the Year, and for establishing the new Calendar now used in England.
Trespass Act 1753	AT 2 of 1753	8 January 1753
An Act for the better preventing Petty Larceny and Trespass.
Common Law Courts Act 1796	AT 1 of 1796	15 July 1796
An Act for the better Regulation of the Court of Common Law.

== 19th century ==
Short title, or popular name	Citation	Royal assent
Long title
Overseas Debts Act 1814	AT 1 of 1814	7 March 1814
An Act for the more easy Recovery of Debts contracted out of the Limits of the Isle of Man.
Debtors Act 1820	AT 1 of 1820	20 October 1820
An Act for the better enforcing of Common Judgments and Executions, and for altering and amending the Law relative to Bail to Actions of Debt or Damage, and for the Relief of Insolvent Debtors in the said Isle.
St Jude's Chapel Act 1839 (repealed)	AT 1 of 1839	1 March 1839
An Act for providing a new Church or Chapel of Ease in the Parish of Andreas.
Ecclesiastical Persons Act 1843	AT 1 of 1843	2 October 1843
An Act for ascertaining and defining certain Rights of Ecclesiastical Persons, Parish Clerks, and Schoolmasters.
Newspapers Act 1846 (repealed)	AT 1 of 1846	26 September 1846
An Act for preventing the Mischief arising from the Printing and Publishing Newspapers and other Papers by Persons not known, and for regulating the Printing and Publication of such Papers in other Respects.
Boundary Walls Act 1851	AT 1 of 1851	7 March 1851
An Act [concerning boundary walls]
Evidence Act 1871	AT 1 of 1871	16 May 1871
An Act to amend the Law of Evidence, and for other purposes.
Criminal Code 1872	AT 1 of 1872	28 May 1872
An Act to consolidate and amend the Criminal Law of this Island.
Public Notices Act 1872	AT 2 of 1872	22 April 1872
An Act to alter the Mode of giving Notices on Sundays.
Brewers Act 1874	AT 2 of 1874	7 July 1874
An Act to Amend the Law as to Brewers and to provide for the Payment of a Duty in respect to Beer.
Douglas Streets Improvement Act 1874	AT 3 of 1874	21 February 1874
An Act for Widening and Improving certain Streets, and for Constructing new Streets and a Promenade in the Town of Douglas.
Courts Amended Procedure Act 1876	AT 1 of 1876	27 June 1876
An Act for Facilitating the Administration of Justice in certain Courts.
Douglas Bay Tramway Act 1876	AT 2 of 1876	12 August 1876
An Act to Authorise the Construction of a Tramway from the Queen Victoria Pier to Strathallan Crescent, in the Town of Douglas.
Douglas Streets Improvement Act 1876	AT 3 of 1876	12 August 1876
An Act intituled “The Douglas Streets Improvement Act, 1876”.
Tynwald Proceedings Act 1876	AT 4 of 1876	28 November 1876
An Act to regulate certain proceedings in the Court of Tynwald.
Ecclesiastical Residences and Dilapidations Act 1879 (repealed)	AT 1 of 1879	26 June 1879
An Act for the amendment of the law relating to Houses of Residence for the Clergy and to Ecclesiastical Dilapidations.
Church Act 1880 (repealed)	AT 1 of 1880	31 July 1880
An Act to amend the Law as to the Church and Clergy.
Game Act 1882	AT 1 of 1882	29 June 1882
An Act to amend the Laws relating to Game in the Isle of Man and for other Purposes.
Bills of Exchange Act 1883	AT 1 of 1883	19 July 1883
An Act to Codify the Law relating to Bills of Exchange, Cheques, and Promissory Notes.
Explosive Substances Act 1883	AT 2 of 1883	22 May 1883
An Act to Amend the Law relating to Dangerous Goods and Explosive Substances.
Isle of Man Judicature Act 1883	AT 3 of 1883	22 May 1883
An Act to provide for the Better Administration of Justice, and for the Constitution of a High Court of Justice in the Isle of Man.
Statutory Time et cetera Act 1883 (repealed)	AT 4 of 1883	14 February 1883
An Act to remove doubts as to the meaning of expressions relative to Time.
Judgments Enforcement Act 1886	AT 2 of 1886	26 June 1886
An Act to Amend the Law as to the Enforcing Judgments in Certain Cases.
Settled Land Act 1891	AT 1 of 1891	20 March 1891
An Act for facilitating Sales, Leases, and other Dispositions of Settled Land, and for promoting the execution of Improvements thereon.
Bankruptcy Code 1892	AT 1 of 1892	28 June 1892
An Act to amend the Law of Bankruptcy and Insolvency.
Bankruptcy Procedure Act 1892	AT 2 of 1892	28 June 1892
An Act to Regulate the Procedure in Bankruptcy and Insolvency.
Douglas Promenade Shelter Act 1892	AT 4 of 1892	28 June 1892
An Act to confer Powers on the Douglas Town Commissioners to erect a Public Shelter and other Conveniences on the Harris Promenade, in the town of Douglas.
Howstrake Estate Act 1892	AT 5 of 1892	28 June 1892
An Act to enable John Travis, Trustee of the Estate of Howstrake, in the Parish of Onchan, to carry out a Sale of a portion of the said Estate, and to authorize the Construction of a Roadway along the Foreshore and Brows from Strathallan Crescent to Onchan Harbour, and for other purposes.
Industrial and Building Societies Act 1892	AT 6 of 1892	28 June 1892
An Act for the incorporation, management and winding-up of industrial, provident and building societies.
Libel and Slander Act 1892	AT 7 of 1892	28 June 1892
An Act to Amend the Law respecting Libel and Slander.
Church Act 1895 (repealed)	AT 1 of 1895	29 June 1895
An Act to amend and extend the Provisions of the Church Act, 1880.
Douglas Cemetery Act 1895	AT 2 of 1895	12 December 1895
An Act to enable the Douglas Town Commissioners to make and maintain a Cemetery at Douglas.
Douglas Municipal Corporation Act 1895	AT 3 of 1895	12 December 1895
An Act to provide for the Municipal Incorporation of the Town of Douglas.
Uniforms Act 1895	AT 5 of 1895	12 December 1895
An Act to regulate and restrict the wearing of Naval and Military Uniforms.
Upper Douglas Tramway Act 1895	AT 6 of 1895	12 December 1895
An Act to authorize the Isle of Man Tramways and Electric Power Company, Limited, to construct a Street Tramway to Upper Douglas, and to carry out the terms of a certain Agreement made between the said Company and the Douglas Town Commissioners.
Isle of Man Steam Packet Company Act 1896	AT 1 of 1896	29 June 1896
An Act to confer Additional Powers on the Isle of Man Steam Packet Company, Limited.
Vagrancy Act 1896	AT 2 of 1896	8 February 1896
An Act concerning Vagrants.
Clergy Residence Act 1897 (repealed)	AT 1 of 1897	26 February 1897
An Act to amend the Law as to Non-Residence of Clergy.
Ecclesiastical Residences and Dilapidations Amendment Act 1897 (repealed)	AT 2 of 1897	7 July 1897
An Act to amend the Ecclesiastical Residences and Dilapidations Act.

== 20th century ==
=== 1903 ===
Short title, or popular name	Citation	Royal assent
Long title
Bankruptcy Code Amendment Act 1903	AT 1 of 1903	20 May 1903
An Act to amend the Bankruptcy Code, 1892.
Public Notices Amendment Act 1903	AT 2 of 1903	25 June 1903
An Act to provide for the Mode of giving Public Notices in certain cases.

=== 1906 ===
Short title, or popular name	Citation	Royal assent
Long title
Pedlars and Street Traders Act 1906	AT 1 of 1906	30 June 1906
An Act for granting Certificates to Pedlars and Licences to Street Traders.

=== 1907 ===
Short title, or popular name	Citation	Royal assent
Long title
Loans (Infants) Act 1907	AT 1 of 1907	6 July 1907
An Act to render penal the inciting of Infants to Borrow Money.
Obscene Publications and Indecent Advertisements Act 1907 (repealed)	AT 2 of 1907	6 July 1907
An Act to make provision for the suppression of Obscene Publications and Indecent Advertisements.

=== 1908 ===
Short title, or popular name	Citation	Royal assent
Long title
Boarding-House (Lien) Act 1908	AT 1 of 1908	4 July 1908
An Act for the relief of Innkeepers and Boarding-House and Lodging-House Keepers.
Conveyancing Act 1908	AT 2 of 1908	4 July 1908
An Act to amend the Law of Vendor and Purchaser; for simplifying and improving the practice of Conveyancing; and for other purposes.
Married Woman's Real Property Act 1908 (repealed)	AT 3 of 1908	4 July 1908
An Act to remove doubts as to the power of a Married Woman, during coverture, to devise her own Real Property.
Preferential Payments Act 1908	AT 4 of 1908	4 June 1908
An Act to provide for the preferential payment of certain debts.

=== 1909 ===
Short title, or popular name	Citation	Royal assent
Long title
Factories and Workshops Act 1909	AT 1 of 1909	2 March 1909
An Act for the regulation of Factories and Workshops, and for the protection of Persons employed therein.
Partnership Act 1909	AT 3 of 1909	3 July 1909
An Act to declare and amend the Law of Partnership.
White Phosphorus Matches Prohibition Act 1909	AT 4 of 1909	3 July 1909
An Act intituled ‘An Act to prohibit the Manufacture and Sale of Matches made with White Phosphorus, and for other purposes in connection therewith’

=== 1914 ===
Short title, or popular name	Citation	Royal assent
Long title
Agricultural and Rural Industries Act 1914	AT 1 of 1914	2 July 1915
An Act to provide for the constitution of a Board of Agriculture for the Isle of Man, and for other purposes.

=== 1915 ===
Short title, or popular name	Citation	Royal assent
Long title
Douglas Corporation (Pulrose Estate) Act 1915	AT 1 of 1915	14 October 1915
An Act to authorize the Mayor, Aldermen, and Burgesses of the Borough of Douglas to acquire the Pulrose Estate, in the Parish of Braddan, and to Borrow £l9,000 to defray the cost of such purchase, and for other purposes.

=== 1916 ===
Short title, or popular name	Citation	Royal assent
Long title
Local Government Consolidation Act 1916	AT 2 of 1916	28 June 1917
An Act for Consolidating the Local Government Acts.

=== 1918 ===
Short title, or popular name	Citation	Royal assent
Long title
Registration of Business Names Act 1918	AT 1 of 1918	2 August 1918
An Act to provide for the Registration of Firms and Persons carrying on business under Business Names and for purposes connected therewith.

=== 1919 ===
Short title, or popular name	Citation	Royal assent
Long title
Isle of Man Constitution Amendment Act 1919	AT 2 of 1919	18 August 1919
An Act to amend, in certain particulars, the Constitution of the Isle of Man.
Tynwald Court Adjournments Act 1919	AT 3 of 1919	25 June 1919
An Act to regulate certain proceedings in the Court of Tynwald.

=== 1920 ===
Short title, or popular name	Citation	Royal assent
Long title
Criminal Code (Informations) Act 1920	AT 1 of 1920	3 December 1920
An Act [concerning rules for informations.]

=== 1921 ===
Short title, or popular name	Citation	Royal assent
Long title
Seeds Act 1921 (repealed)	AT 4 of 1921	10 August 1921
An Act to amend the Law with respect to the sale and use of Seeds for sowing and of Seed Potatoes and to provide for the testing thereof.
Sex Disqualification (Removal) Act 1921 (repealed)	AT 5 of 1921	14 February 1921
An Act to amend the Law with respect to disqualifications on account of sex.

=== 1922 ===
Short title, or popular name	Citation	Royal assent
Long title
Conveyancing Act 1922	AT 1 of 1922	20 June 1922
An Act to Amend the Conveyancing Act, 1908.
Local Government Amendment Act 1922	AT 2 of 1922	2 November 1922
An Act to amend the Local Government Consolidation Act, 1916.
Oaths Act 1922	AT 3 of 1922	1 April 1922
An Act [to make further provision about oaths]

=== 1923 ===
Short title, or popular name	Citation	Royal assent
Long title
Education Endowments Act 1923	AT 2 of 1923	11 October 1923
An Act [to vest certain school premises in the Isle of Man Central Education Authority]
Mechanical Contrivances Regulation Act 1923	AT 3 of 1923	31 May 1923
An Act to make provision for the Inspection of Mechanical Contrivances used for Amusement.
Pensions (Penalties) Act 1923	AT 4 of 1923	12 February 1923
An Act [concerning Pension Penalties.]

=== 1924 ===
Short title, or popular name	Citation	Royal assent
Long title
Agricultural Credits Act 1924	AT 1 of 1924	25 July 1924
An Act [concerning agricultural credits.]

=== 1927 ===
Short title, or popular name	Citation	Royal assent
Long title
Game Act 1927	AT 1 of 1927	27 June 1927
An Act to amend the Game Acts.
Highway Act 1927 (repealed)	AT 3 of 1927	27 June 1927
An Act to consolidate and amend the Highway Acts, 1889 to 1924.
Independent Methodist Trust Property Act 1927	AT 4 of 1927	13 May 1927
An Act to amend the law relating to Independent Methodist Trust Property.
Petty Sessions and Summary Jurisdiction Act 1927	AT 5 of 1927	3 November 1927
An Act to consolidate and amend the Acts relating to Proceedings in the Courts of Petty Session and Summary Jurisdiction.
War Memorials (Local Authorities Powers) Act 1927 (repealed)	AT 6 of 1927	22 April 1927
An Act to enable Local Authorities to maintain, repair, and protect War Memorials.

=== 1928 ===
Short title, or popular name	Citation	Royal assent
Long title
Allotments Act 1928	AT 1 of 1928	6 February 1928
An Act to provide for the acquisition and letting of Allotments and to make provision with respect to Allotments.
Dangerous Goods Act 1928	AT 2 of 1928	7 May 1928
An Act to regulate Dangerous Goods.
Imprisonment for Debt Act 1928	AT 3 of 1928	7 May 1928
An Act to amend the law as to imprisonment for debt.
Infanticide and Infant Life (Preservation) Act 1938	AT 3 of 1928	1 April 1938
An Act to amend the law with regard to the destruction of children at or before birth.
Industrial and Building Societies Amendment Act 1928	AT 4 of 1928	15 June 1928
An Act to amend the Industrial and Building Societies Act 1892.
Local Government (Singing Rooms) Act 1928 (repealed)	AT 5 of 1928	7 May 1928
An Act [Concerning singing rooms]

=== 1929 ===
Short title, or popular name	Citation	Royal assent
Long title
Census Act 1929	AT 1 of 1929	1 March 1929
An Act to make provision for the taking from time to time of a Census of the Population of the Isle of Man.
Local Government Amendment Act 1929	AT 2 of 1929	5 November 1929
An Act to amend the Local Government Acts, 1916-24.

=== 1930 ===
Short title, or popular name	Citation	Royal assent
Long title
Employment of Women, Young Persons and Children Act 1930	AT 2 of 1930	15 May 1930
An Act to carry out certain Conventions relating to the employment of Women, Young Persons and Children, and to amend the law with respect to the employment of Women and Young Persons in Factories and Workshops.
Members of Tynwald (Disqualification) Act 1930	AT 3 of 1930	15 May 1930
An Act to prohibit Members of Tynwald from contracting with or supplying Goods to the Insular Government or Boards of Tynwald.
Petroleum Filling Stations (Regulation) Act 1930	AT 4 of 1930	26 June 1930
An Act to regulate petroleum filling stations.

=== 1931 ===
Short title, or popular name	Citation	Royal assent
Long title
Companies Act 1931	AT 2 of 1931	23 July 1931
An Act to consolidate the Companies Acts 1910 to 1926, and certain other enactments connected with the said Acts.
Factories and Workshops (Amendment) Act 1931 (repealed)	AT 3 of 1931	29 June 1931
An Act to amend the Factories and Workshops Act, 1909.
Howstrake Estate Act Amendment Act 1931	AT 5 of 1931	20 March 1931
An Act to amend the Howstrake Estate Act, 1892.
Partition Act 1931	AT 7 of 1931	20 March 1931
An Act to amend the law as to real estate held in undivided shares.

=== 1932 ===
Short title, or popular name	Citation	Royal assent
Long title
Third Parties (Rights against Insurers) Act 1932	AT 1 of 1932	17 March 1932
An Act to confer on third parties rights against insurers of third-party risks in the event of the insured becoming insolvent, and in certain other events.
Wild Birds Protection Act 1932	AT 2 of 1932	10 June 1932
An Act to repeal the enactments providing for the protection of wild birds and to substitute other provisions therefor.

=== 1934 ===
Short title, or popular name	Citation	Royal assent
Long title
Agricultural Marketing Act 1934	AT 1 of 1934	14 August 1934
An Act to provide for the regulation and marketing of agricultural products, for the regulation of the importation and exportation of agricultural products, and for purposes connected therewith.
Boiler Act 1934	AT 2 of 1934	14 May 1934
An Act relating to the construction and inspection of boilers and the holding of inquiries with regard to boiler explosions.
Land Drainage Act 1934 (repealed)	AT 4 of 1934	29 June 1934
An Act to consolidate and amend the law with regard to land drainage.

=== 1935 ===
Short title, or popular name	Citation	Royal assent
Long title
Bankers' Books Evidence Act 1935	AT 1 of 1935	4 May 1935
An Act to amend the law as to evidence with respect to bankers’ books.
Married Women's Property Act 1935 (repealed)	AT 3 of 1935	6 June 1935
An Act to provide for a married woman trustee of real and personal estate.

=== 1936 ===
Short title, or popular name	Citation	Royal assent
Long title
Emergency Powers Act 1936	AT 1 of 1936	28 May 1936
An Act to make exceptional provision for the protection of the community in cases of emergency.
Factories and Workshops Amendment Act 1936	AT 3 of 1936	3 March 1936
An Act to amend the Factories and Workshops Acts.
Port St Mary Estate Act 1936	AT 5 of 1936	24 March 1936
An Act to enable the Port St. Mary Commissioners to lay out and improve the lands called The Port St. Mary Estate and for other purposes.
Slaughter of Animals Act 1936 (repealed)	AT 6 of 1936	30 April 1936
An Act to provide for the humane and scientific slaughter of animals; and for purposes connected therewith.
Stamps Management Act 1936	AT 7 of 1936	3 March 1936
An Act to provide for the regulation of public stamps.
Trade Disputes (Regulation) Act 1936	AT 9 of 1936	28 May 1936
An Act to provide against intimidation in the case of a trade dispute.

=== 1937 ===
Short title, or popular name	Citation	Royal assent
Long title
Blind Persons' Welfare Act 1937	AT 1 of 1937	8 June 1937
An Act to confer powers upon the Manx Blind Welfare Society and promote the welfare of blind persons.
Filing of Statutory Documents Act 1937 (repealed)	AT 2 of 1937	13 February 1937
An Act to require statutory regulations, bye-laws, orders, etc., to be filed in the Rolls Office.

=== 1938 ===
Short title, or popular name	Citation	Royal assent
Long title
Douglas Library Act 1938 (repealed)	AT 1 of 1938	6 May 1938
An Act to amend the law relating to the library rate.
Douglas Squares Act 1938	AT 2 of 1938	23 June 1938
An Act to vest Hutchinson Square and Woodbourne Square in the Mayor Aldermen and Burgesses of the Borough of Douglas.
Judicature (Reports of Judicial Proceedings) Act 1938	AT 4 of 1938	28 July 1938
An Act to regulate the publication of reports of judicial proceedings in such manner as to prevent injury to public morals.
Law Reform (Miscellaneous Provisions) Act 1938	AT 5 of 1938	1 April 1938
An Act to amend the law as to the effect of death in relation to causes of action and as to the awarding of interest in civil proceedings.
Local Government (No 3) Act 1938	AT 6 of 1938	28 July 1938
An Act to amend the Local Government Consolidation Act, 1916.
National Defence Property Regulation Act 1938	AT 8 of 1938	28 July 1938
An Act to enable byelaws to be made as to the use of land held for national defence purposes and securing public safety.

=== 1939 ===
Short title, or popular name	Citation	Royal assent
Long title
Charitable Collections (Regulation) Act 1939	AT 1 of 1939	5 October 1939
An Act to provide for the regulation of certain collections for charitable purposes; and for matters connected therewith.
Evidence Act 1939	AT 2 of 1939	2 February 1939
An Act to amend the law of evidence.
Factories and Workshops Amendment Act, 1939	AT 3 of 1939	3 November 1939
An Act to amend the Factories and Workshops Acts.
Hire Purchase Act 1939	AT 6 of 1939	23 November 1939
An Act to amend the law with respect to the hire purchase and sale upon credit of goods and the law of distress in its relation thereto.
Personal Injuries (Emergency Provisions) Act 1939	AT 8 of 1939	11 December 1939
An Act to make provision as respects certain personal injuries sustained during the period of the present emergency.
Seeds Amendment Act 1939 (repealed)	AT 9 of 1939	3 July 1939
An Act to amend the Seeds Act, 1921.

=== 1940 ===
Short title, or popular name	Citation	Royal assent
Long title
Liability for War Damage (Miscellaneous Provisions) Act 1940	AT 1 of 1940	5 April 1940
An Act to modify certain rights and liabilities with respect to goods lost or damaged by war.
Public Authorities Staffs (War Service) Act 1940 (repealed)	AT 2 of 1940	19 March 1940
An Act to make provision with respect to war service of officers of the local authorities and public Boards.

=== 1941 ===
Short title, or popular name	Citation	Royal assent
Long title
House of Keys and Public Authorities Elections Act 1941	AT 1 of 1941	10 October 1941
An Act to postpone elections to the House of Keys and Public Authorities and the preparation of Voters’ Lists, and for purposes incidental thereto.
Superannuation Schemes (War Service) Act 1941 (repealed)	AT 2 of 1941	28 February 1941
An Act to enable provision to be made for preventing loss of benefits under certain superannuation schemes by persons undertaking service in the forces or employment for war purposes.
War Charities Act 1941	AT 4 of 1941	30 May 1941
An Act to provide for the registration and control of war charities, and for purposes connected with war charities.

=== 1942 ===
Short title, or popular name	Citation	Royal assent
Long title
Cancer Act 1942	AT 1 of 1942	13 July 1942
An Act to make further provisions for the treatment of cancer, to prohibit certain advertisements relating to cancer, and for purposes connected with the matters aforesaid.

=== 1943 ===
Short title, or popular name	Citation	Royal assent
Long title
Personal Injuries (Emergency Provisions) Act 1943	AT 1 of 1943	10 February 1943
An Act to amend the Personal Injuries (Emergency Provisions) Act, 1939.

=== 1944 ===
Short title, or popular name	Citation	Royal assent
Long title
Education (Young Peoples Welfare) Act 1944 (repealed)	AT 1 of 1944	8 December 1944
An Act to provide for the development of facilities for and the encouragement of physical training recreation and the mental and moral welfare of young persons and for meeting the necessary cost.
Law Reform (Frustrated Contracts) Act 1944	AT 2 of 1944	17 April 1944
An Act to amend the law relating to the frustration of contracts.

=== 1945 ===
Short title, or popular name	Citation	Royal assent
Long title
Derby Square Act 1945	AT 1 of 1945	30 October 1945
An Act to vest Derby Square in the Mayor, Aldermen and Burgesses of the Borough of Douglas.
Oaths and Registration of Deeds (Captioning) Act 1945	AT 3 of 1945	3 August 1945
An Act to enable oaths to be taken, affidavits to be made, and deeds captioned before certain officers and official persons.

=== 1946 ===
Short title, or popular name	Citation	Royal assent
Long title
Criminal Evidence Act 1946	AT 1 of 1946	24 September 1946
An Act to amend the Law of Evidence.
Disabled Persons (Employment) Act 1946 (repealed)	AT 2 of 1946	4 June 1946
ACT to make further and better provision for enabling persons handicapped by disablement to secure employment, or work on their own account, and for purposes connected therewith.
Law Reform (Contributory Negligence) Act, 1946	AT 3 of 1946	26 June 1946
An Act to amend the law relating to contributory negligence and for purposes connected therewith.
Local Government Act 1946	AT 4 of 1946	29 November 1946
An Act to amend the Isle of Man Local Government Acts, 1916 to 1946, in certain limited respects, and make provision for the preservation of amenities, acquisition of land in advance of requirements, hospital accommodation, registration of nursing homes, the provision of laboratories, and notification of births.
Petty Sessions and Summary Jurisdiction Act 1946	AT 5 of 1946	24 September 1946
An Act to amend the Petty Sessions and Summary Jurisdiction Act, 1927.

=== 1947 ===
Short title, or popular name	Citation	Royal assent
Long title
Witnesses' Allowances Act 1947	AT 1 of 1947	21 May 1947
An Act to amend the law relating to the fees payable to constables in civil actions and allowances to witnesses.
Firearms Act 1947	AT 2 of 1947	11 June 1947
An Act to consolidate and amend the provisions of the Firearms Acts, 1921 and 1935, relating to firearms, imitation firearms and other weapons and to ammunition.
Nurses and Midwives Act 1947 (repealed)	AT 3 of 1947	11 June 1947
An Act to provide for the restriction of the use of the name or title of nurse or midwife, to prohibit unqualified midwives acting as maternity nurses, and to regulate agencies for the supply of nurses for the sick.

=== 1948 ===
Short title, or popular name	Citation	Royal assent
Long title
Agricultural Marketing (No 2) Act 1948	AT 1 of 1948	8 October 1948
An Act to authorise the Isle of Man Board of Agriculture and Fisheries to control the prices at which certain agricultural products may be sold, and for other purposes.
Church Act 1948	AT 3 of 1948	11 March 1948
An Act to amend the law relating to the endowments and property of the See of Sodor and Man, and for other purposes.
Exportation of Horses Act 1948	AT 4 of 1948	5 August 1948
An Act to amend the law with respect to the exportation of horses and for purposes connected therewith.
Housing (Rent Control) Act 1948	AT 6 of 1948	22 June 1948
An Act to make provision with respect to the rent of houses or parts thereof let at a rent which includes payment for the use of furniture or for services.

=== 1949 ===
Short title, or popular name	Citation	Royal assent
Long title
Law Reform (Personal Injuries) Act 1949	AT 3 of 1949	28 January 1949
An Act to abolish the defence of common employment, to amend the law relating to the measure of damages for personal injury or death, and for purposes connected therewith.
Queen's Gardens Act 1949	AT 5 of 1949	28 January 1949
An Act [concerning the Queen’s Gardens in Douglas.]

=== 1950 ===
Short title, or popular name	Citation	Royal assent
Long title
Agricultural Marketing Act 1950	AT 1 of 1950	31 March 1950
An Act to authorise the Isle of Man Agricultural Marketing Society to operate markets and to sell farms, land and agricultural implements and livestock and for other purposes.
Consular Conventions (Isle of Man) Act 1950	AT 2 of 1950	3 February 1950
An Act to confer upon the consular officers of foreign States with which consular conventions are concluded by His Majesty certain powers relating to the administration of the estates and property of deceased persons.
Douglas Crescent (Amendment) Act 1950	AT 3 of 1950	25 April 1950
An Act [to empower the erection of a Bandstand.]
Fire Escapes Act 1950 (repealed)	AT 4 of 1950	25 April 1950
An Act to require the occupiers and owners of certain buildings to provide proper means of escape in the case of fire for the persons residing therein.
Local Government (Entertainments) Act 1950	AT 7 of 1950	3 February 1950
An Act to repeal the Local Government Act, 1935, and re-enact such Act, increasing the rate for entertainments and other purposes.
Mines and Quarries Regulation Act 1950	AT 10 of 1950	25 April 1950
An Act to make further provision with respect to the regulation of mines and quarries.
Onchan Village District Park and Ballachrink Estate Act 1950	AT 12 of 1950	26 June 1950

=== 1951 ===
Short title, or popular name	Citation	Royal assent
Long title
National Assistance (Isle of Man) Act 1951 (repealed)	AT 3 of 1951	15 March 1951
An Act to terminate the existing poor law and to provide in lieu thereof for the assistance of persons in need by the Isle of Man Board of Social Services; to make further provision for the welfare of disabled, sick, aged and other persons and for regulating homes for disabled and aged persons and charities for disabled persons; to amend the law relating to non-contributory old age pensions; to make provision as to the burial or cremation of deceased persons; and for purposes connected with the matters aforesaid.

=== 1952 ===
Short title, or popular name	Citation	Royal assent
Long title
Agricultural Wages Act 1952	AT 1 of 1952	24 March 1952
An Act to consolidate and revise the Agricultural Wages (Regulation) Acts, 1942 and 1945.
Bail Act 1952	AT 2 of 1952	23 May 1952
An Act to consolidate and amend the law relating to bail.
Dealers in Old Metal Act 1952	AT 3 of 1952	10 March 1952
An Act to control the sale of old metals.
Douglas Extension of Boundaries Act 1952	AT 4 of 1952	24 March 1952
An Act to extend the boundaries of the Borough of Douglas and for purposes incidental thereto.
Forgery Act 1952	AT 5 of 1952	10 March 1952
An Act to consolidate, simplify and amend the Law relating to Forgery and kindred offences.
Fraudulent Mediums Act 1952 (repealed)	AT 6 of 1952	10 March 1952
An Act to make, in substitution for certain provisions of section two of the Vagrancy Act, 1896, express provision for the punishment of persons who fraudulently purport to act as spiritualistic mediums or to exercise powers of telepathy, clairvoyance or other similar powers.
Perjury Act 1952	AT 8 of 1952	23 May 1952
An Act to revise the law relating to perjury and kindred offences.

=== 1953 ===
Short title, or popular name	Citation	Royal assent
Long title
Action of Arrest Act 1953	AT 1 of 1953	11 February 1953
An Act to abolish Chancery Arrests and substitute a different procedure.
Criminal Justice Act 1953	AT 2 of 1953	11 March 1953
An Act to amend the law relating to court procedure; trial of certain indictable offences; larceny offences and other matters.
Industrial and Building Societies Act 1953	AT 3 of 1953	28 May 1953
An Act to raise the limit on the interest in the shares of a society registered under the Industrial and Building Societies Act, 1892, and nominated sums.
Rating and Valuation Act 1953	AT 4 of 1953	28 May 1953
An Act to consolidate and amend the law relating to Rating and Valuation.

=== 1954 ===
Short title, or popular name	Citation	Royal assent
Long title
Civil Defence Act 1954	AT 2 of 1954	21 December 1954
An Act to make better provision for civil defence.
Conveyancing (Leases and Tenancies) Act 1954	AT 3 of 1954	21 December 1954
An Act to simplify and improve the practice of Conveyancing in relation to leases and tenancies of real estate.
Dangerous Goods Act 1954	AT 4 of 1954	20 January 1954
An Act to extend the control of certain explosives and apply any of the provisions of the Dangerous Goods Act, 1928, to other substances.
Defamation Act 1954	AT 5 of 1954	13 May 1954
An Act to amend the law relating to libel and slander and other malicious falsehoods.
Employment Act 1954 (repealed)	AT 6 of 1954	3 June 1954
An Act to make further provision relating to employment; the regulation of employment; the avoidance of strikes and lockouts; and for purposes connected therewith.
Land Drainage Act 1954 (repealed)	AT 7 of 1954	15 July 1954
An Act to amend the Land Drainage Acts.
Landlord and Tenant Act 1954	AT 8 of 1954	21 December 1954
An Act to clarify and amend the law relating to landlord and tenant.
Prevention of Crime Act 1954	AT 9 of 1954	20 January 1954
An Act to prohibit the carrying of offensive weapons in public places without lawful authority or reasonable excuse.
Recovery of Rent Act 1954	AT 10 of 1954	21 December 1954
An Act to declare and amend the law in regard to the recovery of rent of real estate.
Registration of Business Names Act 1954	AT 11 of 1954	13 April 1954
An Act to amend the Registration of Business Names Act, 1918.
Tenancies (Implied Terms) Act 1954	AT 12 of 1954	21 December 1954
An Act to clarify and amend the law relating to terms which are implied in contracts of tenancy.

=== 1955 ===
Short title, or popular name	Citation	Royal assent
Long title
Agricultural Marketing Act 1955	AT 2 of 1955	17 March 1955
An Act to amend the Agricultural Marketing Acts.
Agricultural Returns Act 1955	AT 3 of 1955	22 December 1955
An Act to facilitate the preparation of agricultural statistics.
Hire-Purchase Act 1955	AT 4 of 1955	17 March 1955
An Act to extend the application of the Hire-Purchase Act, 1939, and to make further provision as to postponed orders for specific delivery of goods under the said Act.
Housing Act 1955	AT 5 of 1955	31 May 1955
An Act to consolidate and revise the Housing Acts, 1924 to 1928, and the Housing Act, 1936.
Industrial and Building Societies (Amendment) Act 1955	AT 6 of 1955	6 May 1955
An Act to amend the Industrial and Building Societies Acts, 1892 to 1953.
Merchandise Marks Act 1955	AT 7 of 1955	8 September 1955
An Act to amend the provisions of the Merchandise Marks Acts, 1898 to 1939, relating to false trade descriptions, and to imported goods bearing the trade mark of a manufacturer, dealer or trader in the United Kingdom or the Isle of Man, and to amend the Merchandise Marks Act, 1898, in relation to offences.
Motor Vehicles (International Circulation) Act 1955	AT 8 of 1955	17 March 1955
An Act to re-enact with modifications the Motor Car (International Circulation) Act, 1931.
Protection of Birds Act 1955	AT 9 of 1955	8 September 1955
An Act to restrict the importation or exportation of certain wild birds and eggs.

=== 1956 ===
Short title, or popular name	Citation	Royal assent
Long title
Douglas Market Act 1956	AT 1 of 1956	3 August 1956
An Act to revise the Douglas Market Act, 1898.
Law Reform (Enforcement of Contracts) Act 1956	AT 2 of 1956	1 June 1956
An Act to amend the Law relating to the Enforceability of certain contracts.
Prevention of Damage by Agricultural Pests Act 1956	AT 3 of 1956	25 January 1956
An Act to make provision for the prevention of damage by agricultural pests.

=== 1957 ===
Short title, or popular name	Citation	Royal assent
Long title
Cremation Act 1957	AT 2 of 1957	15 February 1957
An Act for the regulation of the burning of human remains and to establish a crematorium.
Diplomatic and Analogous Immunities and Privileges Act 1957	AT 3 of 1957	29 April 1957
An Act to enable the Governor, by order, to apply to the Isle of Man the provisions of the International Organisations (Immunities and Privileges) Act, 1950, and the Diplomatic Immunities (Commonwealth Countries and Republic of Ireland) Act, 1952, and the provisions of any Order in Council made or continued in force under those Acts.
Game Act 1957	AT 4 of 1957	31 July 1957
An Act to amend the Game Acts, 1882 to 1942.
Meritorious Service (Grants and Pensions) Act 1957	AT 5 of 1957	13 December 1957
An Act to enable grants and pensions to be given in recognition of meritorious services to the Isle of Man.
Weeds Act 1957	AT 6 of 1957	24 June 1957
An Act to provide for the suppression of injurious weeds.

=== 1958 ===
Short title, or popular name	Citation	Royal assent
Long title
Bills of Exchange Act 1958	AT 1 of 1958	7 January 1958
An Act to amend the law relating to cheques and certain other instruments and to amend section 51(4) of the Bills of Exchange Act, 1883.
Finance Act 1958	AT 2 of 1958	14 March 1958
An Act to give effect to the agreement made with the Imperial Government relative to financial control.

=== 1959 ===
Short title, or popular name	Citation	Royal assent
Long title
Manx Museum and National Trust Act 1959	AT 4 of 1959	20 November 1959
An Act to consolidate and revise the Manx Museum and National Trust Acts, 1886 to 1951.

=== 1960 ===
Short title, or popular name	Citation	Royal assent
Long title
Local Government (Ferries) Act 1960	AT 2 of 1960	11 May 1960
An Act to authorise Commissioners of town districts to operate ferry services.
Recreational Charities (Isle of Man) Act 1960	AT 3 of 1960	8 April 1960
An Act to declare charitable under the law of the Isle of Man the provision in the interests of social welfare of facilities for recreation or other leisure-time occupation.
Summary Jurisdiction Act 1960	AT 4 of 1960	11 May 1960
An Act to amend the Summary Jurisdiction Acts.

=== 1961 ===
Short title, or popular name	Citation	Royal assent
Long title
Agriculture (Poisonous Substances) Act 1961	AT 1 of 1961	27 February 1961
An Act to provide for the protection of employees against risks of poisoning by certain substances used in agriculture.
Companies Act 1961	AT 2 of 1961	2 August 1961
An Act to amend the Companies Act, 1931.
Isle of Man Constitution Act 1961	AT 6 of 1961	27 November 1961
An Act to amend the Constitution of the Isle of Man and to make procedural and other amendments in relation to the Legislature and Tynwald.
Music and Dancing Act 1961 (repealed)	AT 7 of 1961	2 August 1961
An Act to make provision for the licensing of places used for public music, singing or dancing.
Pool Betting (Isle of Man) Act 1961	AT 8 of 1961	26 June 1961
An Act to legalise pool betting in the Isle of Man and for the imposition of a pool betting duty; to regulate the disposal of moneys and to provide for the publication of certain accounts and information in connection with pool betting; to permit ready money bets in certain circumstances by way of pool betting conducted by post; and for purposes connected therewith.
Registration of Deeds Act 1961	AT 9 of 1961	14 April 1961
An Act to consolidate and revise the Registration of Deeds Act, 1847 to 1951, and certain other enactments connected with the said Acts.
Trustee Act 1961	AT 10 of 1961	24 March 1961
An Act to consolidate certain enactments relating to trustees in the Isle of Man.
Variation of Trusts Act 1961	AT 11 of 1961	24 March 1961
An Act to extend the jurisdiction of the High Court to vary trusts in the interests of beneficiaries and sanction dealings with trust property.

=== 1962 ===
Short title, or popular name	Citation	Royal assent
Long title
Charities Act 1962	AT 1 of 1962	25 January 1962
An Act to extend the powers of the High Court relating to the Charities, to make further provisions as to powers exercisable by or with respect to charities or with respect to gifts to charity and for purposes connected therewith.
Commissioners for Oaths Act 1962	AT 2 of 1962	23 May 1962
An Act for the appointment of Commissioners for Oaths and related matters.
Finance Act 1962	AT 3 of 1962	19 December 1962
An Act to abolish the Accumulated Fund; to transfer its moneys to the General Revenue and to transfer its investments to the Reserve Fund upon payment out of the Reserve Fund to the General Revenue of a sum equal to the nominal value of those investments; to permit an increase in the amount of the Reserve Fund and to provide for an earlier date for the Budget.

=== 1963 ===
Short title, or popular name	Citation	Royal assent
Long title
Conveyancing Act 1963	AT 2 of 1963	28 January 1963
An Act to define the status of mortgages and classify the law relating to the abolition of curtesy and dower.
Criminal Justice Act 1963	AT 3 of 1963	29 July 1963
An Act to abolish transportation, penal servitude, hard labour and prison divisions; to amend the law relating to the probation of offenders, and otherwise to reform existing methods and provide new methods of dealing with offenders and persons liable to imprisonment; to provide approved probation hostels; to constitute case committees for petty sessions districts; to amend the law relating to proceedings of criminal courts; to empower courts to order compensation for victims of crime; to re-enact certain enactments relating to the matters aforesaid; and for purposes connected therewith.
Curraghs Acquisition Act 1963	AT 4 of 1963	20 December 1963
An Act to provide for the vesting of certain curragh lands in the Government Property Trustees and for purposes incidental thereto.
Destructive Imported Animals Act 1963	AT 5 of 1963	30 May 1963
An Act to make provision for prohibiting or controlling the importation into and the keeping within the Isle of Man of destructive non-indigenous animals, for exterminating any such animals which may be at large, and for purposes connected with the matters aforesaid.
Food and Drugs Act 1963 (repealed)	AT 6 of 1963	30 May 1963
An Act [to extent the application of the Slaughter of Animals Act 1936.]
Local Government Act 1963	AT 10 of 1963	29 July 1963
An Act to amend the law relating to local government.
Pinfolds Act 1963	AT 12 of 1963	29 July 1963
An Act to abolish the parish pinfolds and to provide for the impoundment of animals in Government pinfolds maintained by the Isle of Man Board of Agriculture and Fisheries, and for matters associated therewith.
Restriction of Offensive Weapons Act 1963	AT 13 of 1963	30 May 1963
An Act to amend the law in relation to the making and disposing and importation of flick knives and other dangerous weapons.
Service of Documents Act 1963	AT 15 of 1963	26 March 1963
An Act to authorise the sending by the recorded delivery service of certain documents and other things required or authorised to be sent by registered post; to authorised personal service by the coroner of documents and other things required or authorised to be sent by any of the postal services; and for purposes connected therewith.

=== 1964 ===
Short title, or popular name	Citation	Royal assent
Long title
Hotel-Keepers' Liability Act 1964	AT 1 of 1964	27 July 1964
An Act to give the force of law in the Isle of Man to the Annex to the Convention on the Liability of Hotel-Keepers concerning the Property of their Guests.
Occupiers' Liability Act 1964	AT 2 of 1964	27 July 1964
An Act to amend the law as to the liability of occupiers and others for injury or damage resulting to persons or goods lawfully on any land or other property from dangers due to the state of the property or to things done or omitted to be done there, and for purposes connected therewith.

=== 1965 ===
Short title, or popular name	Citation	Royal assent
Long title
Evidence Act 1965 (repealed)	AT 1 of 1965	26 February 1965
An Act to substitute a new section for section eighteen of the Evidence Act, 1871.
General Registry Act 1965	AT 2 of 1965	3 August 1965
An Act to amalgamate the functions of the Rolls Office, the Deeds Registry and the Office of the Registrar General and for matters ancillary thereto.
Stock Transfer Act 1965	AT 8 of 1965	3 August 1965
An Act to amend the law with respect to the transfer of securities.

=== 1966 ===
Short title, or popular name	Citation	Royal assent
Long title
Advertisements (Hire-Purchase) (Isle of Man) Act 1966	AT 1 of 1966	22 June 1966
An Act to make provision as to the information to be included in advertisements displayed or issued in connection with hire-purchase or credit sale; and for purposes connected with the matter aforesaid
Agriculture and Horticulture Act 1966	AT 3 of 1966	6 April 1966
An Act to make provision for and in connection with the maintenance of minimum price levels for imports affecting the market for agricultural and horticultural produce of descriptions produced in the Isle of Man of the United Kingdom and for purposes connected therewith.
Castletown Town Act 1966	AT 4 of 1966	16 May 1966
An Act for purposes incidental to the extension of the boundaries of the Town of Castletown and for other purposes relating to local government in the said Town.

=== 1967 ===
Short title, or popular name	Citation	Royal assent
Long title
Criminal Evidence Act 1967 (repealed)	AT 1 of 1967	24 May 1967
An Act to make certain trade or business records admissible as evidence in criminal proceedings.
Onchan Village District (Birch Hill) Estate Act 1967	AT 2 of 1967	28 July 1967
Sexual Offences Act 1967 (repealed)	AT 9 of 1967	23 August 1967
An Act to consolidate with corrections and improvements the statute law relating to sexual crimes, to the abduction, procuration and prostitution of women and to kindred offences.

=== 1968 ===
Short title, or popular name	Citation	Royal assent
Long title
Air Guns and Shot Guns etc Act 1968	AT 1 of 1968	12 July 1968
An Act to restrict the use and possession of air guns, shot guns, and similar weapons.
Companies Act 1968	AT 2 of 1968	14 February 1968
An Act to amend the Companies Act 1931 by making new provisions as to the issue of prospectuses and for liability in respect of mis-statements therein; to provide a remedy in cases of oppression; to authorise a newly registered company to be required to change its name if found to be too like that of an existing company; to repeal the requirement contained in section 55 of the principal Act by which a banking company may not call up more than one third of each share created or issued prior to the 23rd day of June 1926 and for purposes connected with the matters aforesaid.
Firearms Act 1968	AT 4 of 1968	22 March 1968
An Act to amend the law relating to firearms, imitation firearms and ammunition and for connected purposes.
Ionising Radiations (Protection of Workers) Act 1968 (repealed)	AT 5 of 1968	14 February 1968
An Act to provide for notification of the commencement of any work or the installation of any machine capable of producing or emitting ionising radiations.
Judgments (Reciprocal Enforcement) (Isle of Man) Act 1968	AT 6 of 1968	22 March 1968
An Act to make provision for the enforcement in the Isle of Man of judgments given in the superior courts of other countries (including the United Kingdom) which afford reciprocal treatment to judgments given in the Isle of Man, for facilitating the enforcement in such countries of judgments given in the Isle of Man, and for purposes incidental thereto.
Manx Time Act 1968	AT 7 of 1968	16 October 1968
An Act to provide for the time in the Isle of Man.
Perpetuities and Accumulations Act 1968	AT 8 of 1968	26 July 1968
An Act to modify the law of the Isle of Man relating to the avoidance of future interests in property on grounds of remoteness and governing accumulations of income from property.
Riding Establishments (Inspection) Act 1968	AT 10 of 1968	8 May 1968
An Act to prohibit the keeping of a riding establishment except under the authority of a licence granted in accordance with the provisions of this Act and providing for the inspection thereof.

=== 1969 ===
Short title, or popular name	Citation	Royal assent
Long title
Agricultural Holdings Act 1969	AT 1 of 1969	28 August 1969
An Act to amend the law relating to agricultural holdings.
Barclays Bank (Isle of Man) Act 1969	AT 2 of 1969	28 August 1969
An Act to carry into effect the transfer to Barclays Bank Limited of the undertaking of Martins Bank Limited; and for other purposes.
Church Act 1969	AT 4 of 1969	25 June 1969
An Act to extend the Ecclesiastical Jurisdiction Measure, 1963, to the Isle of Man, to extend the Episcopal Church (Scotland) Act, 1964, to the Isle of Man, and for other purposes.
National Westminster Bank (Isle of Man) Act 1969	AT 8 of 1969	31 July 1969
An Act to provide for the transfer to National Westminster Bank Limited of the undertakings of National Provincial Bank Limited and Westminster Bank Limited and for other purposes incidental thereto and consequential thereon.

=== 1970 ===
Short title, or popular name	Citation	Royal assent
Long title
South Ramsey (Compulsory Acquisition Etc) Act 1970	AT 1 of 1970	12 February 1975
An Act to vest certain lands in the Isle of Man Local Government Board to establish its title thereto and to provide for ancillary matters.
Betting Act 1970 (repealed)	AT 1 of 1970	4 February 1970
An Act to amend the law with respect to betting and to provide for the licensing of bookmakers and bookmaking offices.
Consumer Protection (Trade Descriptions) Act 1970	AT 2 of 1970	30 September 1970
An Act to replace the Merchandise Marks Acts 1898 to 1955 by fresh provisions prohibiting misdescriptions of goods, services, accommodation and facilities provided in the course of trade; to prohibit false or misleading indications as to the price of goods; to confer power to require information or instructions relating to goods to be marked on or to accompany the goods or to be included in advertisements; to prohibit the unauthorised use of devices or emblems signifying royal awards; and for purposes connected with those matters.
Income Tax Act 1970	AT 3 of 1970	24 March 1970
An Act to consolidate the Income Tax Acts.
Onchan Village District (Birch Hill) Estate Act 1970	AT 6 of 1970	28 July 1970
An Act to apply the provisions of the Onchan Village District (Birch Hill) Estate Act 1967 to certain additional properties.
Pool Betting (Isle of Man) Act 1970 (repealed)	AT 7 of 1970	24 March 1970
An Act to amend the procedure with reference to the recovery of pool betting duty and for matters ancillary thereto.
Ramsey Town Act 1970	AT 8 of 1970	28 July 1970
An Act for the consolidation and revision of the legislation exclusively applicable to the Town of Ramsey and to provide also for purposes incidental to the extension of the boundaries of the Town of Ramsey and other purposes relating to local government in the said Town.
Rating and Valuation Act 1970	AT 9 of 1970	29 May 1970
An Act to amend the Rating and Valuation Act 1953.
Tourist Premises (Compensation for Tenants Improvements) Act 1970	AT 11 of 1970	17 December 1970
An Act to provide for the payment of compensation to tenants of tourist premises for improvements made by them to the premises.

=== 1971 ===
Short title, or popular name	Citation	Royal assent
Long title
Gross and Rateable Values (Special Variations) Act 1971	AT 1 of 1971	10 February 1971
An Act to enable the Governor, by order, with the approval of Tynwald, in certain circumstances to vary the amounts of gross and rateable values expressed in enactments where other matters depend upon those amounts.
Music and Dancing Act 1971 (repealed)	AT 6 of 1971	11 March 1971
An Act to provide for the temporary amendment of the Music and Dancing Acts by order of the Governor.
Chapmen's Act 1971	AT 9 of 1971	30 April 1971
An Act to control the activities of itinerant buyers of household or personal effects.
Church (Miscellaneous Provisions) Act 1971	AT 11 of 1971	25 May 1971
An Act to constitute the Sodor and Man Diocesan Synod and for other purposes.
Isle of Man Constitution Act 1971	AT 13 of 1971	25 May 1971
An Act to provide that the Attorney General shall cease to have the right to vote in Tynwald or the Council whilst retaining membership thereof.
Tenancy of Business Premises Act 1971	AT 17 of 1971	28 July 1971
An Act to make provision with regard to tenancies of premises used for business, trade or professional purposes.
Sea-Fisheries Act 1971 (repealed)	AT 18 of 1971	28 July 1971
An Act to consolidate with minor amendments the law relating to the sea- fisheries of the Isle of Man.
Game (Hares) Act 1971	AT 20 of 1971	28 July 1971
An Act to remove protection from certain hares.
Family Law Reform (Isle of Man) Act 1971	AT 26 of 1971	27 October 1971
An Act to amend the law relating to the age of majority, to persons who have not attained that age and to the time when a particular age is attained; to make provision for the use of blood tests for the purpose of determining the paternity of any person in civil proceedings; to make provision with respect to the evidence required to rebut a presumption of legitimacy and illegitimacy; to make further provision in connection with the registration of the birth of an illegitimate child, for entering the name of the father; and for connected purposes.
Isle of Man Constitution (Elections to Council) Act 1971 (repealed)	AT 34 of 1971	22 December 1971
An Act to clarify and amend the procedure for the election of members of the Legislative Council.
Local Government (Rating) Act 1971	AT 35 of 1971	22 December 1971
An Act to amend the law with regard to the collection or enforcement of commissioners’ rates.
Government Property Act 1971	AT 39 of 1971	22 December 1971
An Act to consolidate, with minor improvements and amendments, the Government Property Trustees Acts 1891 to 1960.

=== 1972 ===
Short title, or popular name	Citation	Royal assent
Long title
Fees Charges Etc Enabling Act 1972 (repealed)	AT 13 of 1972	14 August 1972
An Act to enable certain fees, charges and other payments prescribed by enactments to be varied or dispensed with by order.
Litter Act 1972	AT 14 of 1972	14 August 1972
An Act to make provision for the abatement of litter.

=== 1973 ===
Short title, or popular name	Citation	Royal assent
Long title
Income Tax Act 1973 (repealed)	AT 2 of 1973	16 February 1973
An Act to amend the Income Tax Acts.
Rating and Valuation Act 1973	AT 4 of 1973	16 February 1973
An Act to amend the method of calculating compensation to rating authorities for the loss of rates in respect of agricultural hereditaments and for associated matters.
Preferential Payments and Other Acts (Financial Adjustments) Act 1973 (repealed)	AT 5 of 1973	16 February 1973
An Act to amend the Bankruptcy Code 1892, the Preferential Payments Act 1908, the Arrest of Goods Act 1954 and the Recovery of Rent Act 1954 so as to increase the maximum value of certain goods which may not be taken from a bankrupt or an execution debtor for the benefit of his creditors and also to increase the maximum amount of salary or wages which certain employees are entitled to be paid in preference to certain other creditors.
Animal Boarding Establishments (Isle of Man) Act 1973	AT 9 of 1973	18 April 1973
An Act to regulate the management and operation of boarding establishments for dogs and cats.
Hire-Purchase Act 1973	AT 10 of 1973	18 April 1973
An Act to amend the law relating to hire-purchase and credit-sale and for purposes connected therewith.
Privileges of Tynwald (Publications) Act 1973	AT 11 of 1973	24 May 1973
An Act to establish privilege in respect of certain matters published by members of Tynwald and by order or under the authority of Tynwald, Legislative Council or the House of Keys.
European Communities (Isle of Man) Act 1973 (repealed)	AT 14 of 1973	16 July 1973
An Act to make provision in connection with the inclusion of the Isle of Man for certain purposes in the European Communities, consequent upon the enlargement thereof to include the United Kingdom.
Civil Evidence Act 1973	AT 18 of 1973	13 November 1973
An Act to amend the law of evidence in relation to civil proceedings, and in respect of the privilege against self-incrimination to make corresponding amendments in relation to statutory powers of inspection or investigation.
Banking and Financial Dealings (Isle of Man) Act 1973	AT 19 of 1973	13 November 1973
An Act to enable orders made by the Treasury suspending financial and other dealings on bank holidays and other days to apply in the Isle of Man, to amend the law relating to bills of exchange and promissory notes with reference to the maturity of bills and notes and other matters affected by the closing of banks on Saturdays and for purposes connected therewith.

=== 1974 ===
Short title, or popular name	Citation	Royal assent
Long title
Fishing Vessels (Safety Provisions) (Isle of Man) Act 1974	AT 3 of 1974	26 March 1974
An Act to provide for the safety of fishing vessels and for certain other matters relating to such vessels and for connected purposes.
Unsolicited Goods and Services (Isle of Man) Act 1974	AT 5 of 1974	10 April 1974
An Act to make provision for the greater protection of persons receiving unsolicited goods, and to amend the law with respect to charges for entries in directories.
Isle of Man Loans Act 1974	AT 6 of 1974	21 May 1974
An Act to provide for the establishment of a Consolidated Loans Fund; to widen the securities available for issue, to enable borrowing from Government by local and other authorities and to provide for the better securing of loans.
Income Tax (Instalment Payments) Act 1974	AT 7 of 1974	21 May 1974
An Act to provide for a means of regular deductions from earnings as instalments of income tax.
Domicile and Matrimonial Proceedings Act 1974	AT 15 of 1974	28 June 1974
An Act to amend the law relating to the domicile of married women and persons not of full age, to matters connected with domicile and to jurisdiction in matrimonial proceedings; to make further provision about the recognition of divorces and legal separations; and for purposes connected therewith.
Carriage of Goods by Sea Act 1974	AT 26 of 1974	25 July 1974
An Act to amend the law with respect to the carriage of goods by sea.
Pensions (Increase) Act 1974	AT 27 of 1974	25 July 1974
An Act to replace the Pensions (Increase) Acts 1947 to 1971 and orders made thereunder.
Agriculture (Safety Health and Welfare Provisions) Act 1974	AT 29 of 1974	25 July 1974
An Act to provide for securing the safety, health and welfare of persons employed in agriculture, and certain other occupations whose working conditions are of a like nature, the avoidance of accidents to children arising out of the use, in connection with agriculture and such other occupations of vehicles, machinery or implements, and for compulsory insurance against liability for, and financial assistance in respect of, the obligations imposed on employers of workers employed in agriculture by this Act.
Companies Act 1974	AT 30 of 1974	14 November 1974
An Act to amend the Companies Acts 1931 to 1968; to provide that a subsidiary company shall not own shares in its holding company; for the conduct of business by insurance companies; for the registration by a company of substantial interests in its own shares; for the investigation of a company’s affairs; prohibiting a company acting as a director; and for various matters relating to the administration of companies.
Mineral Workings (Offshore Installations) (Isle of Man) Act 1974	AT 33 of 1974	4 December 1974
An Act to provide for the safety, health and welfare of persons on installations concerned with the underwater exploitation and exploration of mineral resources in the waters in or surrounding the Isle of Man, and generally for the safety of such installations and the prevention of accidents on or near them.
Road Traffic (International Agreements) Act 1974	AT 36 of 1974	18 December 1974
An Act to empower the Isle of Man Highway and Transport Board to make orders to enable effect to be given to certain international agreements in the Isle of Man.

=== 1975 ===
Short title, or popular name	Citation	Royal assent
Long title
South Ramsey (Acquisition of Certain Land) Act 1975	AT 1 of 1975	12 February 1975
An Act to vest certain lands in the Isle of Man Local Government Board to establish its title thereto and to provide for ancillary matters.
Estate Agents Act 1975	AT 6 of 1975	18 March 1975
An Act to make provision with respect to persons who negotiate for, or otherwise act in relation to, the acquisition or disposal by others of estates, interests or rights in or over land; and for purposes connected therewith.
Fire Precautions Act 1975	AT 18 of 1975	23 July 1975
An Act to make better provision for the protection of persons from fire risks; and for purposes connected therewith.
Tourist Act 1975	AT 19 of 1975	17 September 1975
An Act to consolidate and revise the law relating to tourism, and for connected purposes.
Employment Agencies Act 1975	AT 20 of 1975	17 September 1975
An Act to regulate employment agencies and businesses; and for connected purposes.
Control of Employment Act 1975 (repealed)	AT 25 of 1975	19 December 1975
An Act to control employment in the Island by making provision restricting the employment (including self-employment) in the Island of persons other than Isle of Man workers; to amend the Employment Acts 1954 to 1965 and certain other enactments; to repeal certain obsolete provisions; and for connected purposes.
Pensions (Supplementary Increase) Act 1975	AT 27 of 1975	19 December 1975
An Act to provide for increases of certain official pensions and to amend the Pensions (Increase) Act 1974; and for purposes connected therewith.
Peel Town Commissioners (Acquisition and Disposal of Land) Act 1975	AT 28 of 1975	19 December 1975
An Act to vest certain land in the Peel Town Commissioners; to provide for the payment of compensation in respect of that land; to confer further powers on those Commissioners in relation to the disposal of land; and for connected purposes.
Housing Improvement Act 1975	AT 29 of 1975	19 December 1975
An Act to provide financial assistance by way of grants and loans for the improvement and provision of dwellings, and for connect purposes.
Tenancies (Implied Terms) (Amendment) Act 1975	AT 30 of 1975	19 December 1975
An Act to amend the Tenancies (Implied Terms) Act 1954 and related matters
Fertilisers and Feeding Stuffs Act 1975	AT 31 of 1975	19 December 1975
An Act to make better provisions in the law relating to fertilisers and feeding stuffs, and for connected purposes.

=== 1976 ===
Short title, or popular name	Citation	Royal assent
Long title
Housing (Miscellaneous Provisions) Act 1976	AT 1 of 1976	19 January 1976
An Act to make further provision in the law relating to housing.
Rating and Valuation (Amendment) Act 1976	AT 3 of 1976	19 January 1976
An Act to amend the Rating and Valuation Acts 1953 to 1973, and for connected purposes.
Price Marking Act 1976	AT 4 of 1976	17 March 1976
An Act to make provision for requiring prices to be indicated on, or in relation to, goods offered or exposed for sale by retail; and for connected purposes.
Local Government (Miscellaneous Provisions) Act 1976	AT 6 of 1976	12 April 1976
An Act to make further provision in the law relating to local government; to amend certain enactments relating to, or connected with, local government; to revise certain pecuniary penalties and fines; and for connected purposes.
Landlord and Tenant (Miscellaneous Provisions) Act 1976	AT 10 of 1976	19 May 1976
An Act to protect occupiers against harassment and eviction without due process of law, to require the giving of rent books and information by landlords to tenants, to amend the Landlord and Tenant Act 1954, and related matters.
Architects Act 1976	AT 11 of 1976	19 May 1976
An Act to make provision for preventing unqualified persons from practising or carrying on business as architects; for the registration of architects; and for connected purposes.
Evidence Act 1976 (repealed)	AT 15 of 1976	23 July 1976
An Act to make further provision in the law relating to evidence, and for connected purposes.
High Court (Transfer of Money and Securities to General Revenue) Act 1976	AT 18 of 1976	23 July 1976
An Act to transfer certain sums of money and securities from the High Court to the Treasurer for the credit of the General Revenue, and for connected purposes.
Interpretation Act 1976 (repealed)	AT 20 of 1976	23 July 1976
An Act to make better provision in the law relating to the interpretation of Acts of Tynwald and instruments of a legislative character made thereunder, and for connected purposes.
Misuse of Drugs Act 1976	AT 21 of 1976	30 July 1976
An Act to make new provision with respect to dangerous or otherwise harmful drugs and related matters, and for purposes connected therewith.
Arbitration Act 1976	AT 24 of 1976	27 October 1976
An Act to consolidate with amendments the law relating to arbitration, and for connected purposes.
Gambling Laws (Amendment) Act 1976	AT 25 of 1976	27 October 1976
An Act to amend the law relating to gambling, and for connected purposes.
Inland Fisheries Act 1976 (repealed)	AT 26 of 1976	15 December 1976
An Act to make better provision in the law relating to fisheries and fishing (other than sea fisheries and sea fishing), and for connected purposes.
Advocates Act 1976	AT 27 of 1976	15 November 1976
An Act to make better provision in the law relating to advocates, and for connected purposes.
Employers Liability (Compulsory Insurance) Act 1976	AT 28 of 1976	15 December 1976
An Act to require employers to insure against their liability for personal injury to their employees, and for connected purposes.

=== 1977 ===
Short title, or popular name	Citation	Royal assent
Long title
Health and Safety at Work Etc Act 1977	AT 1 of 1977	17 January 1977
An Act to make better provision for health and safety in certain places; and for connected purposes.
Short Titles Act 1977 (repealed)	AT 4 of 1977	26 July 1977
An Act to provide short titles for certain Acts of Tynwald enacted since Revestment.
Cinematograph Act 1977	AT 6 of 1977	21 December 1977
An Act to make better provision for regulating cinematograph exhibitions and to modify the Music and Dancing Act 1961.
Tourist Premises (Provision and Improvement) Act 1977	AT 8 of 1977	21 December 1977
An Act to provide financial assistance for the provision and improvement of tourist premises, the guaranteeing of loans made for the provision and improvement of such premises, and connected matters.

=== 1978 ===
Short title, or popular name	Citation	Royal assent
Long title
Church (Ecclesiastical Jurisdiction) Act 1978	AT 3 of 1978	21 March 1978
An Act to extend the Ecclesiastical Jurisdiction (Amendment) Measure 1974 to the Isle of Man.
Pre-Revestment Written Laws (Ascertainment) Act 1978 (repealed)	AT 5 of 1978	21 March 1978
An Act to repeal certain obsolete laws enacted or made prior to Revestment; to specify which of the pre-Revestment laws are still in force and to provide short titles therefor; and for matters connected therewith.
Income Tax (Retirement Benefit Schemes) Act 1978	AT 9 of 1978	31 May 1978
An Act to provide for the tax treatment of occupational pension schemes.
Income Tax Act 1978 (repealed)	AT 12 of 1978	25 July 1978
An Act to provide for the tax treatment of captive insurance companies and to amend the Income Tax Act 1970.

=== 1979 ===
Short title, or popular name	Citation	Royal assent
Long title
Income Tax (Amendment) Act 1979 (repealed)	AT 2 of 1979	6 February 1979
An Act to amend the Income Tax Act 1970 and for connected purposes.
Consular Relations Act 1979	AT 4 of 1979	6 February 1979
An Act to provide for the extension to the Island of certain provisions of the Consular Relations Act 1968(an Act of Parliament), or of any enactment of Parliament amending or replacing that Act, or of any Order in Council made under that Act or under any such enactment, and for connected purposes.
Stock Exchange (Completion of Bargains) (Isle of Man) Act 1979	AT 5 of 1979	14 March 1979
An Act to amend and clarify the law relating to the transfer of securities and to companies, trustees and personal representatives with a view to simplifying the activities connected with the periodic completion of bargains made on stock exchanges; and for purposes connected therewith.
Poisons Act 1979	AT 8 of 1979	14 March 1979
An Act to make better provision in the law relating to poisons, and for connected purposes.
Church Act 1979 (repealed)	AT 10 of 1979	14 March 1979
An Act to provide for the establishment of a scheme for the inspection of churches, to make provision with respect to the age limit for the holding of certain ecclesiastical offices, to apply the provisions of the Faculty Jurisdiction Measure 1964 with adaptations to the Island and for connected purposes.
Merchant Shipping (Passenger Ships' Survey) Act 1979	AT 11 of 1979	14 March 1979
An Act to provide for the survey of certain passenger ships; to amend the Merchant Shipping Act 1935; and for connected purposes.
Merchant Shipping (Detention of Ships) Act 1979	AT 13 of 1979	14 March 1979
An Act to provide for the detention of ships in certain cases, and for connected purposes.
Merchant Shipping (Masters and Seamen) Act 1979	AT 14 of 1979	30 March 1979
An Act to make better provision in the law relating to masters and seamen in merchant ships, and for purposes connected therewith.
European Communities (Implementation of Article 3 of Regulation 706/73) Act 1979 (repealed)	AT 15 of 1979	23 May 1979
An Act to provide for the implementation of certain obligations of the Isle of Man in relation to the European Economic Community, and for matters connected therewith.
Industrial and Building Societies Act 1979	AT 16 of 1979	23 May 1979
An Act to make further provision in relation to industrial and building societies, and for connected purposes.
Shipping Casualties (Inquiries, Investigations and Reports) Act 1979	AT 18 of 1979	23 May 1979
An Act to make fresh provision in relation to inquiries and investigations into shipping casualties and to reports in relation to such casualties, and for connected purposes.
Anchors and Chain Cables Act 1979	AT 20 of 1979	23 May 1979
An Act to consolidate with amendments certain enactments relating to anchors and chain cables, and for connected purposes.
Wreck and Salvage (Ships and Aircraft) Act 1979	AT 24 of 1979	26 July 1979
An Act to make better provision in the law relating to wreck and salvage in the case of ships and aircraft, and for connected purposes.
Referendum Act 1979	AT 28 of 1979	14 November 1979
An Act to provide for the holding of referenda in the Isle of Man, and for connected purposes.

=== 1980 ===
Short title, or popular name	Citation	Royal assent
Long title
Governor's General Functions (Transfer) Act 1980 (repealed)	AT 1 of 1980	13 February 1980
An Act to transfer certain of the functions of the Governor, and for connected purposes.
Energy Act 1980	AT 3 of 1980	13 February 1980
An Act to make further provision with respect to the Island’s resources and use of energy.
Wild Animals (Restriction on Importation, Etc.) Act 1980	AT 4 of 1980	13 February 1980
An Act to restrict the importation and keeping of certain animals, and for connected purposes.
Coinage Offences Act 1980	AT 8 of 1980	21 May 1980
An Act to revise the law relating to coinage offences, and for connected purposes.
Jury Act 1980	AT 9 of 1980	24 June 1980
An Act to revise the law relating to juries.
Cathedral Church Act 1980 (repealed)	AT 11 of 1980	28 July 1980
An Act to constitute a Cathedral Church for the Diocese of Sodor and Man, and to amend the Church Act, 1895 and for connected purposes.
Civil Liability (Contribution) Act 1981	AT 14 of 1980	31 July 1981
An Act to make new provision for contribution between persons who are jointly or severally, or both jointly and severally, liable for the same damage and in certain other similar cases where two or more persons have paid or may be required to pay compensation for the same damage; and to amend the law relating to proceedings against persons jointly liable for the same debt or jointly or severally, or both jointly and severally, liable for the same damage.
Income Tax Act 1980	AT 16 of 1980	13 October 1980
An Act to make further provision in relation to income tax, and for connected purposes.
Misrepresentation and Unfair Contract Terms Act 1980	AT 18 of 1980	17 December 1980
An Act to make further provision in the law relating to civil misrepresentation; to impose further limits on the extent to which civil liability for breach of contract, or for negligence or other breach of duty, can be avoided by means of contract terms and otherwise; and for connected purposes.

=== 1981 ===
Short title, or popular name	Citation	Royal assent
Long title
Reprints Act 1981 (repealed)	AT 1 of 1981	18 February 1981
An Act to provide for the Publication of Reprints of certain Acts of Tynwald and for connected purposes.
Endangered Species (Import and Export) Act 1981 (repealed)	AT 3 of 1981	18 February 1981
An Act to restrict the importation and exportation (including removal from and to the United Kingdom) of certain animals, plants and items and to restrict certain transactions in respect of them or their derivatives; to confer on the Isle of Man Board of Agriculture and Fisheries power to restrict by order the places at which live animals may be imported; to restrict the movement after importation of certain live animals; and for connected purposes.
Administration of Justice Act 1981	AT 8 of 1981	31 July 1981
An Act to change the jurisdiction and procedure of the Courts in respect of civil matters; to make better provision for the enforcement of the execution of certain judgments and orders; to make certain other amendments in the law relating to the administration of justice; and for connected purposes
Board of Consumer Affairs Act 1981	AT 9 of 1981	31 July 1981
An Act to provide for the establishment of a Board of Consumer Affairs; for the conferring of functions on that Board; for the abolition of the Consumer Council; and for connected purposes.
Fatal Accidents Act 1981	AT 13 of 1981	31 July 1981
An Act to consolidate with amendments the Fatal Accidents Acts.
Animals Act 1981	AT 15 of 1981	31 July 1981
An Act to make provision with respect to civil liability for damage done by animals and with respect to the protection of livestock from dogs; and for purposes connected therewith.
Home Affairs Board Act 1981	AT 18 of 1981	28 October 1981
An Act to provide for the establishment of a Home Affairs Board; for the conferring of functions on that Board; for enabling the Governor in Council to obtain information and assistance; and for connected purposes.
Criminal Damage Act 1981	AT 19 of 1981	28 October 1981
An Act to revise the law as to offences of damage to property; to repeal certain enactments relating to such offences; and for connected purposes.
Criminal Law Act 1981	AT 20 of 1981	28 October 1981
An Act to make further provision relating to the criminal law, and for connected purposes.
Theft Act 1981	AT 21 of 1981	28 October 1981
An Act to revise the law as to theft and similar or associated offences, and in connection therewith to make provision as to criminal proceedings by one party to a marriage against the other; and for other purposes connected therewith.
Merchant Shipping (Load Lines) Act 1981 (repealed)	AT 24 of 1981	28 October 1981
An Act to make better provisions as to load lines and related matters, and for connected purposes.
Rating and Valuation (Amendment) Act 1981	AT 25 of 1981	28 October 1981
An Act to amend the Rating and Valuation Acts 1953 to 1976, and for connected purposes.
Breeding of Dogs and Cats Act 1981	AT 27 of 1981	24 November 1981
An Act to regulate the commercial breeding of dogs and cats; to provide for inspection of premises at which dogs and cats are bred and for control over the transportation of puppies and kittens; and for purposes connected with those matters.
Carriage of Goods by Sea (Amendment) Act 1981	AT 28 of 1981	24 November 1981
An Act to replace by amounts equivalent to special drawing rights of the International Monetary Fund the amounts in gold francs specified in certain provisions limiting the liability of shipowners and others; and for connected purposes.
Control of Advertising Act 1981	AT 29 of 1981	24 November 1981
An Act to control advertising in the vicinity of certain road racing courses and for connected purposes.
Employers Liability (Defective Equipment) Act 1981	AT 30 of 1981	24 November 1981
An Act to make further provision with respect to the liability of an employer for injury to his employee which is attributable to any defect in equipment provided by the employer for the purposes of the employer’s business; and for connected purposes.
Income Tax Act 1981 (repealed)	AT 31 of 1981	24 November 1981
An Act to make further provision in relation to income tax, and for connected purposes.
Law Reform (Mercantile Guarantee) Act 1981	AT 32 of 1981	24 November 1981
An Act to amend the law relating to guarantees and securities, and for connected purposes.
Torts (Interference with Goods) Act 1981	AT 35 of 1981	24 November 1981
An Act to amend the law concerning conversion and other torts affecting goods.
Chronically Sick and Disabled Persons Act 1981 (repealed)	AT 36 of 1981	24 November 1981
An Act to make further provision with respect to the welfare of chronically sick and disabled persons and for connected purposes.

=== 1982 ===
Short title, or popular name	Citation	Royal assent
Long title
Methodist Church Act 1982	AT 1 of 1982	29 June 1982
An Act to establish and incorporate the Trustees for Manx Methodist Church Purposes and to vest in them all property held upon the trusts of the Model Deed of the Methodist Church.
Companies Act 1982	AT 2 of 1982	10 March 1982
An Act to amend the law relating to companies and for connected purposes.
Isle of Man Passenger Transport Act 1982	AT 3 of 1982	29 June 1982
An Act to make better provision in respect of transport in the Island, and for connected purposes.
Land Registration Act 1982	AT 7 of 1982	16 August 1982
An Act to provide for the registration of the title to land, and for connected purposes.
Inheritance (Provision for Family and Dependants) Act 1982	AT 8 of 1982	20 August 1982
An Act to make fresh provision for empowering the court to make orders for the making out of the estate of a deceased person of provision for the spouse, former spouse, child, child of the family or dependant of that person; and for matters connected therewith.
Government Property Trustees (Railway Easements) Act 1982	AT 10 of 1982	20 August 1982
An Act to preserve, in perpetuity, certain easements of the Government Property Trustees; and for connected purposes.
Manx Heritage Foundation Act 1982	AT 12 of 1982	26 November 1982
An Act to provide for the establishment of the Manx Heritage Foundation Fund; and for connected purposes.
Road Races Act 1982 (repealed)	AT 14 of 1982	7 December 1982
An Act to consolidate with amendments the Road Races Acts 1951 and 1975, and related enactments.
Apportionment Act 1982	AT 17 of 1982	30 December 1982
An Act to provide for the apportionment of periodical income.

=== 1983 ===
Short title, or popular name	Citation	Royal assent
Long title
Fisheries Act 1983	AT 1 of 1983	9 March 1983
An Act to amend the Sea-Fisheries Act 1971, the Inland Fisheries Act 1976, and for connected purposes.
Mercantile Agents Act 1983	AT 2 of 1983	22 March 1983
An Act to amend the law relating to mercantile agents, and for connected purposes.
Powers of Attorney Act 1983	AT 5 of 1983	26 April 1983
An Act to make new provision in relation to powers of attorney and the delegation by trustees of their trusts, powers and discretions.
Evidence Act 1983	AT 7 of 1983	29 April 1983
An Act to amend the law relating to evidence in civil and criminal proceedings and for connected purposes.
Sale of Goods Act 1983	AT 9 of 1983	13 June 1983
An Act to consolidate the law relating to the sale of goods.
Statute Law Revision Act 1983	AT 10 of 1983	21 June 1983
An Act to make minor amendments to certain enactments; to repeal certain spent and obsolete enactments; and for connected purposes.
British Nationality (Fees) Act 1983	AT 11 of 1983	18 May 1983
An Act to prescribe the fees payable in the Island for the purposes of enactments of Parliament relating to British nationality.
Plant Health Act 1983	AT 15 of 1983	11 July 1983
An Act to amend the law relating to destructive insects and pests and for connected purposes.
Arbitration (International Investment Disputes) Act 1983	AT 16 of 1983	29 June 1983
An Act to implement an international Convention on the settlement of investment disputes between States and nationals of other States.
Conveyancing Act 1983	AT 17 of 1983	6 July 1983
An Act to make provision for the modification and discharge of restrictions affecting land, and for the priority of mortgages; and for connected purposes.
Justices Act 1983	AT 23 of 1983	27 July 1983
An Act to provide for the appointment of justices of the peace by the Lieutenant Governor; to provide for residential qualifications for justices of the peace; to consolidate certain enactments relating to justices of the peace; and for connected purposes.
Non-Resident Traders Act 1983	AT 26 of 1983	23 November 1983
An Act to revise the law relating to non-resident traders; and for connected purposes.

=== 1984 ===
Short title, or popular name	Citation	Royal assent
Long title
Local Government (Miscellaneous Provisions) Act 1984	AT 5 of 1984	20 February 1984
An Act to make fresh provision for the removal and disposal of vehicles; to confer additional powers on local authorities; to make provision for absent voters in local elections; to control the practices of acupuncture, tattooing, ear-piercing and electrolysis; to increase certain penalties and for connected purposes.
Superannuation Act 1984 (repealed)	AT 8 of 1984	28 March 1984
An Act to consolidate with amendments certain enactments relating to the superannuation of persons in the public service; to make further provision for such superannuation; and for connected purposes.
Acquisition of Land Act 1984	AT 9 of 1984	10 April 1984
An Act to consolidate with amendments the Lands Clauses Act 1871, the Public Authorities Acquisition of Land Acts 1923 to 1948 and other enactments relating to the acquisition of land by public authorities and others; and for connected purposes.
Telecommunications Act 1984 (repealed)	AT 11 of 1984	25 June 1984
An Act to provide for the licensing, regulation and provision of telecommunication services; and for connected purposes.
Civil Registration Act 1984	AT 12 of 1984	18 May 1984
An Act to consolidate with amendments the enactments relating to the civil registration service and the registration of births and deaths; and for connected purposes
Marriage Act 1984	AT 13 of 1984	18 May 1984
An Act to consolidate with amendments certain enactments relating to the solemnization and registration of marriage; and for connected purposes.
Adoption Act 1984 (repealed)	AT 14 of 1984	20 June 1984
An Act to revise the law relating to adoption, and for connected purposes.
Merchant Shipping (Registration) Act 1984	AT 15 of 1984	25 June 1984
An Act to make fresh provision in relation to the registration of British ships in the Island; and to provide for the appointment of marine surveyors.
Gaming (Amendment) Act 1984	AT 17 of 1984	31 July 1984
An Act to control the keeping for use, and the sale and supply, of certain amusement machines; to impose an interim excise duty in relation to such machines; and for connected purposes.
Limitation Act 1984	AT 18 of 1984	31 July 1984
An Act to consolidate with amendments the Statutes of Limitations Acts 1891 to 1981.
Fire Services Act 1984	AT 19 of 1984	14 August 1984
An Act to consolidate with minor amendments the enactments relating to fire services; to amend the Fire Precautions Act 1975; and for connected purposes.
Forestry Act 1984	AT 20 of 1984	19 September 1984
An Act to consolidate with amendments certain enactments with respect to forestry and other matters relating to the Isle of Man Forestry, Mines and Lands Board; to provide for the extinguishment of certain rents payable to that Board; to confer further powers on that Board; and for connected purposes.
Barclays Bank (Isle of Man) Act 1984	AT 21 of 1984	19 September 1984
An Act to provide for the transfer to Barclays Bank International Limited of the undertaking of Barclays Bank PLC on the reorganisation of the Barclays group of companies; and for other purposes.
Tynwald Proceedings Act 1984	AT 23 of 1984	19 October 1984
An Act to amend the Tynwald Proceedings Act 1876; and to make new provision for the privileges of Tynwald.

=== 1985 ===
Short title, or popular name	Citation	Royal assent
Long title
Merchant Shipping Act 1985	AT 3 of 1985	18 February 1985
An Act to provide for safety and health on ships; to provide powers for inspectors; to enable the application of certain legislation of Parliament to the Isle of Man; to require certain documents to be carried, to amend enactments relating to merchant shipping; and for connected purposes.
Douglas Extension of Boundaries Act 1985	AT 6 of 1985	19 March 1985
An Act to extend the boundaries of the Borough of Douglas and for purposes incidental thereto.
Collection of Fines etc. Act 1985	AT 7 of 1985	10 May 1985
An Act to make new provision for the collection of fines and other sums payable by order of a criminal court and of certain maintenance payments; and for connected purposes.
Conveyancing Act 1985	AT 9 of 1985	19 June 1985
An Act to amend the law relating to the devolution of real estate on death; to make further provision for the deduction of title to land; to make provision for the execution of documents by a person nominated by the High Court; to make minor amendments to the Registration of Deeds Act 1961; and for connected purposes.
Legitimacy Act 1985	AT 10 of 1985	19 June 1985
An Act to revise the law relating to legitimacy; to amend the law relating to illegitimate children and others; and for connected purposes.
Wills Act 1985	AT 11 of 1985	19 June 1985
An Act to re-enact with certain amendments the Wills Acts 1869 to 1983.
Gas Undertakings Act 1985	AT 12 of 1985	17 June 1985
An Act to provide for the change of designation of the Isle of Man Water and Gas Authority as a consequence of the sale of the Authority’s gas undertaking; to validate actions taken in respect of that sale; to enable the Governor in Council to apply certain enactments to persons supplying gas; and to provide for connected matters.
Medical Act 1985 (repealed)	AT 14 of 1985	20 June 1985
An Act to re-enact with minor amendments the Medical Acts 1958.
Trade Disputes Act 1985	AT 18 of 1985	3 July 1985
An Act to make fresh provision for the settlement of trade disputes.
Road Traffic Regulation Act 1985	AT 20 of 1985	29 July 1985
An Act to consolidate with amendments and improvements certain enactments relating to the regulation of road traffic.
Licensing and Registration of Vehicles Act 1985	AT 21 of 1985	29 July 1985
An Act to consolidate with amendments the enactments relating to the licensing and registration of mechanically propelled vehicles and trailers; and for connected purposes.
Income Tax Etc. (Amendment) Act 1985 (repealed)	AT 22 of 1985	29 July 1985
An Act to abolish land speculation tax; to amend enactments relating to income tax and company registration tax; to provide for limited disclosure of information between certain Government Departments, and for connected purposes.
Road Traffic Act 1985	AT 23 of 1985	23 September 1985
An Act to repeal and re-enact with amendments certain enactments relating to road traffic and for connected purposes.
Local Government Act 1985	AT 24 of 1985	23 September 1985
An Act to re-enact with amendments certain enactments relating to the Local Government of the Island; and for connected purposes.
Treasury Act 1985	AT 25 of 1985	23 September 1985
An Act to provide for the establishment of a new Board of Tynwald to be called the Treasury; for the conferring of functions on that Board; for the abolition of the Finance Board and the corporation sole known as the Treasurer of the Isle of Man; and for connected purposes.
Auctions Act 1985	AT 26 of 1985	12 August 1985
An Act to amend the law relating to auctions, mock auctions, bidding agreements; and for connected purposes.
Dental Act 1985	AT 29 of 1985	30 December 1985
An Act to restrict the practice and business of dentistry; and for connected purposes.

=== 1986 ===
Short title, or popular name	Citation	Royal assent
Long title
Douglas Foreshore and Town Act 1886	AT 1 of 1986	3 April 1886
An Act to confer additional powers on the Douglas Town Commissioners.
Fines Act 1986	AT 1 of 1986	14 February 1986
An Act to revise the pecuniary penalties and fines for offences against various enactments and for connected purposes.
Congenital Disabilities (Civil Liability) Act 1986	AT 3 of 1986	14 February 1986
An Act to make provision as to civil liability in the case of children born disabled in consequence of some person’s fault; and for connected purposes.
Children and Young Persons Act 1966	AT 5 of 1986	28 July 1966
An Act to consolidate and revise the Children Acts 1910 to 1953.
Sharing of Church Buildings Act 1986	AT 5 of 1986	26 February 1986
An Act to extend the Sharing of Church Buildings Act 1969 (an Act of Parliament) to church buildings in the Isle of Man; and for connected purposes.
Statute Law Revision Act 1986	AT 6 of 1986	28 February 1986
An Act to make minor amendments to certain enactments; to repeal certain spent and obsolete enactments; and for connected purposes.
Building Societies Act 1986	AT 7 of 1986	28 February 1986
An Act to amend the Industrial and Building Societies Acts 1892 to 1979 and to make new provision relating to building societies.
Onchan District Act 1986	AT 8 of 1986	5 March 1986
An Act to amalgamate the village district of Onchan and the parish district of Onchan; and for connected purposes.
Local Elections Act 1986 (repealed)	AT 10 of 1986	11 March 1986
An Act to make fresh provision for the election of members of local authorities; to re-enact with minor amendments certain enactments dealing with the qualifications for, and tenure of, office of members of local authorities; and for connected purposes.
Oil Pollution Act 1986	AT 12 of 1986	14 March 1986
An Act to replace the Oil in Manx Navigable Waters Act 1971; to make new provision for the prevention, etc. of oil pollution; for the implementation of international conventions relating to oil pollution; and for connected purposes.
Human Tissue Act 1986	AT 13 of 1986	14 March 1986
An Act to make provisions with respect to the use of parts of bodies of deceased persons for therapeutic purposes and purposes of medical education and research and with respect to the circumstances in which post-mortem examinations may be carried out; and to permit the cremation of bodies removed for anatomical examination; and for connected purposes.
Legal Practitioners Registration Act 1986	AT 15 of 1986	11 April 1986
An Act to regulate certain legal practitioners carrying on business in the Island; for the registration of such practitioners; to establish an Advocates Disciplinary Tribunal; to transfer certain functions of the Council of the Isle of Man Law Society to that Tribunal; and for connected purposes.
Casino Act 1986	AT 16 of 1986	11 April 1986
An Act to make fresh provision for gaming at casinos; and for connected purposes.
Highways Act 1986	AT 17 of 1986	11 April 1986
An Act to consolidate with amendments and improvements certain enactments relating to highways and other roads.
Legal Aid Act 1986	AT 23 of 1986	13 June 1986
An Act to re-enact the Legal Aid (Isle of Man) Act 1973 as amended; to make new provision for legal advice or assistance to persons of small means; to repeal and replace the enactments relating to criminal legal aid; and for connected purposes.
Income Tax (Amendment) Act 1986	AT 25 of 1986	12 June 1986
An Act to amend enactments relating to income tax and company registration tax; and for connected purposes.
Burials Act 1986	AT 26 of 1986	2 July 1986
An Act to re-enact with amendments the Burials Acts 1881 to 1962 and related enactments.
Charities Act 1986	AT 27 of 1986	2 July 1986
An Act to make new provision with respect to small charities; to amend the Public Charities Act 1922; and to repeal with savings certain enactments relating to specific charities.
Food (Emergency Provisions) Act 1986	AT 33 of 1986	15 July 1986
An Act to authorise the making in an emergency of orders specifying activities which are to be prohibited as a precaution against the consumption of food rendered unsuitable for human consumption in consequence of an escape of substances.
Customs and Excise Management Act 1986	AT 34 of 1986	11 August 1986
An Act to provide for the collection and management of the revenues of customs and excise; for other matters in relation to imports and exports; and for connected purposes.
Alcoholic Liquor Duties Act 1986 (repealed)	AT 35 of 1986	24 July 1986
An Act to make provision relating to the excise duties on spirits, beer, wine, made-wine and cider; to repeal and replace certain other enactments relating to excise; and to provide for connected matters.
Excise Duties (Surcharges or Rebates) Act 1986	AT 37 of 1986	24 July 1986
An Act to provide for surcharges on, and rebates of excise duties; and for connected purposes.
Hydrocarbon Oil Duties Act 1986	AT 38 of 1986	25 July 1986
An Act to provide for the imposition of excise duties on hydrocarbon oil, petrol substitutes, power methylated spirits and road fuel gas and for connected purposes.
Tobacco Products Duty Act 1986	AT 39 of 1986	24 July 1986
An Act to provide for the imposition of excise duty on tobacco products and for connected purposes.
Customs and Excise Duties (General Reliefs) Act 1986	AT 40 of 1986	24 July 1986
An Act to provide for reliefs and exemptions from customs and excise duties, and for other matters.
Radio Equipment Act 1986	AT 41 of 1986	24 July 1986
An Act to enable the Department of Home Affairs to prohibit the manufacture or importation of certain wireless telegraphy apparatus; and for connected purposes.
Rent and Rating Appeals Act 1986	AT 43 of 1986	24 July 1986
An Act to constitute the Isle of Man Rent and Rating Appeal Commissioners; to confer certain functions on them in connection with valuations for rating purposes and rent control; and for connected purposes.
Companies Act 1986	AT 45 of 1986	10 October 1986
An Act to make new provision in relation to the capacity, rights, powers and privileges of companies; to make miscellaneous amendments to the Companies Acts 1931 to 1982; and for connected purposes.
Minerals Act 1986	AT 46 of 1986	10 October 1986
An Act to facilitate the discovery and working of minerals; and for connected purposes.
Petroleum Act 1986	AT 47 of 1986	10 October 1986
An Act to vest in the Department of Industry the property in petroleum and natural gas within the Island; to make provision with respect to the searching and boring for and getting of petroleum and natural gas; to provide for the application to the Island of certain legislation of Parliament relating to petroleum and pipe-lines, etc; and for purposes connected with those matters.

=== 1987 ===
Short title, or popular name	Citation	Royal assent
Long title
Coroners Act 1983	AT 4 of 1987	26 April 1983
An Act to consolidate, with amendments, the law relating to the jurisdiction of Coroners and the payment of Coroners’ fees.
Powers of Attorney Act 1987	AT 5 of 1987	10 August 1987
An Act to enable powers of attorney to be created which will survive any subsequent mental incapacity of the donor and to make provision in connection with such powers.
Coroners of Inquests Act 1987	AT 6 of 1987	19 August 1987
An Act to re-enact with amendments the enactments relating to coroners of inquests; and for connected purposes.
Ballacosnahan Homes Act 1987	AT 7 of 1987	19 August 1987
An Act to provide for the future administration of the charitable trust created under the Will of Anne Thomas who died prior to the 22nd day of April 1862, to widen the trusts thereby created so that they encompass the general poor of the Town of Peel, to relieve the Peel Town Commissioners its members and officers from liability in respect of anything done or omitted to be done in relation to the trust whilst such Commissioners were the Trustees thereof, and to release them from liability to be surcharged in connection with the expenditure of money upon the trust property.
Recognition of Divorces etc Act 1987	AT 9 of 1987	8 October 1987
An Act to amend the law with respect to the recognition of divorces, annulments and legal separations; to make further provision with respect to the effect of divorces and annulments on wills; and for connected purposes.
Airports and Civil Aviation Act 1987	AT 10 of 1987	21 October 1987
An Act to consolidate enactments relating to airports; to confer new powers on the Department of Infrastructure in relation to the regulation of airports and of vehicles on airports; to enable the Department for Enterprise to apply to the Island certain UK legislation relating to civil aviation, air navigation and airports; and for connected purposes.
Child Custody Act 1987	AT 11 of 1987	4 December 1987
An Act to amend the law relating to the jurisdiction of courts in the Island to make orders with regard to the custody of children; to make provision for the recognition and enforcement of custody orders as between the Island and the United Kingdom; to enable two Conventions relating respectively to the civil aspects of international child abduction and the recognition and enforcement of custody decisions to be extended to the Island; to amend the criminal law relating to the abduction of children; and for connected purposes.
Church Act 1987	AT 12 of 1987	14 December 1987
An Act to make new provision for the government of the Church of England in the Isle of Man in accordance with the Synodical Government Measure 1969; and for connected purposes.
Government Departments Act 1987	AT 13 of 1987	17 December 1987
An Act to re-enact with amendments various enactments relating to Departments of the Government; to provide for the appointment of members of Departments; to provide for the exercise of the functions of Departments; and for connected purposes.
Statutory Boards Act 1987	AT 14 of 1987	17 December 1987
An Act to re-enact with amendments certain enactments relating to Statutory Boards; and for connected purposes.

=== 1988 ===
Short title, or popular name	Citation	Royal assent
Long title
Promulgation Act 1988 (repealed)	AT 3 of 1988	29 January 1988
An Act to provide for the promulgation of Acts of Tynwald.
Hypnotism Act 1988	AT 4 of 1988	29 January 1988
An Act to regulate the demonstration of hypnotic phenomena for purposes of public entertainment.
Mineral Workings (Offshore Installations) Act 1988	AT 7 of 1988	11 March 1988
An Act to extend and amend the Mineral Workings (Offshore Installations) (Isle of Man) Act 1974; and for connected purposes.
Recognition of Trusts Act 1988	AT 8 of 1988	30 March 1988
An Act to enable the Convention on the law applicable to trusts and on their recognition to be extended to the Isle of Man.
Nursing and Residential Homes Act 1988 (repealed)	AT 9 of 1988	30 March 1988
An Act to make fresh provision for the registration and regulation of nursing and residential care homes; and for connected purposes.
Radio Masts Regulation Act 1988	AT 11 of 1988	15 April 1988
An Act to prohibit the erection or use of radio masts and antennae without the consent of the Telecommunications Commission; and for connected purposes.
Food Protection Act 1988	AT 12 of 1988	7 June 1988
An Act to regulate the importation, manufacture, sale, supply and use of certain substances as precaution against the production and consumption of food and feeding stuffs that contain those substances or residues; and to provide powers to monitor and limit the entry of contaminants into the food chain; and for connected purposes.
Gaming, Betting and Lotteries Act 1988	AT 17 of 1988	14 October 1988
An Act to re-enact with amendments the enactments relating to gaming, betting and lotteries; and for connected purposes.
Interception of Communications Act 1988	AT 18 of 1988	29 November 1988
An Act to make new provision for and in connection with the interception of communications sent by post or by means of public telecommunication systems; and for connected purposes.

=== 1989 ===
Short title, or popular name	Citation	Royal assent
Long title
Weights and Measures Act 1989	AT 1 of 1989	21 February 1989
An Act to re-enact with amendments the Weights and Measures Acts 1971 and 1978; to make further provision with respect to weights and measures; and for connected purposes.
Michael District Act 1989	AT 2 of 1989	21 March 1989
An Act to amalgamate the village district of Michael and the parish district of Michael; and for connected purposes.
Payment of Members' Expenses Act 1989	AT 4 of 1989	16 May 1989
An Act to replace the Payment of Members’ Expenses Acts 1975 to 1985.
Bank Holidays Act 1989	AT 5 of 1989	16 May 1989
An Act to make new provision in place of the Bankers’ Act 1872; and for connected purposes.
Statute Law Revision Act 1989	AT 6 of 1989	21 June 1989
An Act to repeal the Postcard Censorship Act 1933; to amend the Architects Act 1976, the Registration of Electors Act 1984 and the Employment Act 1986; to make minor amendments to certain enactments; and to repeal various spent, obsolete or redundant enactments.
Bees Act 1989	AT 7 of 1989	21 June 1989
An Act to make new provision for the control of pests and diseases affecting bees; and for connected purposes.
Multilateral Investment Guarantee Agency Act 1989	AT 8 of 1989	21 June 1989
An Act to implement the Convention establishing the Multilateral Investment Guarantee Agency.
Charities Registration Act 1989 (repealed)	AT 11 of 1989	17 October 1989
An Act to repeal and replace the Public Charities Act 1922; to make further provision for the regulation of charities; to confer new powers for the investigation of the affairs of charities; and for connected purposes.
Fees and Duties Act 1989 (repealed)	AT 12 of 1989	17 October 1989
An Act to replace certain enactments relating to fees and duties and to provide for connected matters.
Property Service Charges Act 1989	AT 14 of 1989	12 December 1989
An Act to amend the law relating to service charges payable by tenants of dwellings and by owners of freehold dwellings in specified circumstances
Summary Jurisdiction Act 1989	AT 15 of 1989	12 December 1989
An Act to re-enact with amendments the enactments relating to courts of summary jurisdiction and related enactments; and for connected purposes.

=== 1990 ===
Short title, or popular name	Citation	Royal assent
Long title
Criminal Justice Act 1990	AT 1 of 1990	20 February 1990
An Act to make provision for the recovery of the proceeds of crime; to make further provision for the investigation of fraud; to amend certain rules of evidence in criminal proceedings; to amend the law with regard to the powers of criminal courts; to amend the Jury Act 1980; and for connected purposes.
Wildlife Act 1990	AT 2 of 1990	20 February 1990
An Act to repeal and re-enact with amendments legislation for the protection of birds; to make new provision for the conservation of wild creatures and wild plants; to prohibit certain methods of killing or taking wild animals; to restrict the introduction of certain animals and plants; to amend certain related enactments; to make new provision relating to nature conservation; and for connected purposes.
Council of Ministers Act 1990	AT 3 of 1990	20 February 1990
An Act to rename the Executive Council; to re-enact with amendments certain enactments relating to the Executive Council; to alter the procedure for the appointment of members of certain bodies; and for connected purposes.
Constitution Act 1990	AT 6 of 1990	14 March 1990
An Act to provide for the election of a President of Tynwald, and that the Governor shall cease to preside at ordinary sittings of Tynwald; and for connected purposes.
Housing (Amendment) Act 1990	AT 7 of 1990	15 May 1990
An Act to re-enact with amendments the enactments relating to houses in multiple occupation and flats; to widen the powers of a local authority to serve a repair notice; and for connected purposes.
Civil Service Act 1990 (repealed)	AT 8 of 1990	15 May 1990
An Act to re-enact with amendments the Civil Service Acts 1962 and 1986 and related enactments; and for connected purposes.
Public Health Act 1990	AT 10 of 1990	19 June 1990
An Act to replace with new provisions various enactments relating to the protection of the public health; and for connected purposes.
NatWest International Trust Corporation (Isle of Man) Act 1990	AT 12 of 1990	10 July 1990
An Act to carry into effect the transfer to NatWest International Trust Corporation (Isle of Man) Limited of the undertakings of Westminster Bank Executor and Trustee Company (Isle of Man) Limited and NatWest International Trust Corporation (Man) Limited; and for other purposes.
Dogs Act 1990	AT 16 of 1990	10 July 1990
An Act to make fresh provision for duties in respect of dogs and the issue of dog licences; to make fresh provision for guard dogs and guard dog kennels; to make better provision for the seizure of stray dogs; to repeal and replace certain enactments concerning dogs; and for connected purposes.
Administration of Estates Act 1990	AT 17 of 1990	10 July 1990
An Act to re-enact with minor amendments the enactments relating to the administration of the estates of deceased persons; and for connected purposes.
Redundancy Payments Act 1990	AT 18 of 1990	10 July 1990
An Act to provide for the making by employers of payments to employees in respect of redundancy; and for connected purposes.

=== 1991 ===
Short title, or popular name	Citation	Royal assent
Long title
Family Law Act 1991	AT 3 of 1991	19 March 1991
An Act to make new provision with respect to parental responsibility for and guardianship of minors; to make new provision as to the custody and maintenance of minors; to amend the law relating to declarations of status; and for connected purposes.
Bishop Barrow's Charity Acts (Repeal) Act 1991	AT 4 of 1991	21 May 1991
An Act to repeal with savings the Bishop Barrow’s Charity Acts 1836 to 1985; and for connected purposes.
Moneylenders Act 1991	AT 6 of 1991	21 May 1991
An Act to make new provision for the regulation of moneylenders and consumer credit; and for connected purposes.
Territorial Sea (Consequential Provisions) Act 1991	AT 7 of 1991	9 July 1991
An Act to provide for various matters as a consequence of the extension of the territorial sea adjacent to the Island by the Territorial Sea Act 1987 (an Act of Parliament); and for other purposes.
Copyright Act 1991	AT 8 of 1991	18 June 1991
An Act to restate the law of copyright with amendments.
Design Right Act 1991	AT 9 of 1991	18 June 1991
An Act to confer a design right in original designs.
Douglas Gas Act 1991	AT 10 of 1991	18 June 1991
An Act to provide for the application of the provisions of the Companies Acts 1931 to 1986 to The Douglas Gas Light Company; to enable the Company to adopt a new Memorandum and Articles of Association and for connected purposes.
Income Tax Act 1989	AT 10 of 1991	12 July 1989
An Act to make further provision in relation to income tax; to amend enactments relating to income tax; and for connected purposes.
Consumer Protection Act 1991	AT 11 of 1991	9 July 1991
An Act to make provision with respect to the liability of persons for damage caused by defective products; to make further provision with respect to the safety of consumers and others; to make provision as to the disposition of motor vehicles let on hire-purchase; to enable certain consumer contracts concluded away from business premises to be cancelled; to provide for the control of misleading advertisements; to provide for the enforcement of certain provisions as to trade marks; and for connected purposes.
High Court Act 1991	AT 12 of 1991	9 July 1991
An Act to repeal and replace with amendments enactments relating to the constitution and jurisdiction of the High Court and the administration of justice therein; to establish a new division of the High Court to be called the Family Division; to make new provision with respect to the jurisdiction in admiralty of the High Court; to extend the remedies available under petitions of doleance; to enable the High Court to award provisional damages for personal injuries; to make new provision with respect to the power of the High Court to order disclosure of documents and the inspection of property, etc. in proceedings for personal injury and death; to amend the law relating to actions for damages for personal injuries, including injuries resulting in death, and to abolish certain actions for loss of services; to enable the High Court to award damages as well as or in substitution for, injunction or specific performance; to amend the Arbitration Act 1976; to repeal certain obsolete or unnecessary enactments relating to the High Court and the administration of justice; to make further provision with respect to the administration of justice and matters connected therewith; and for connected purposes.
Merchant Shipping Registration Act 1991	AT 15 of 1991	9 July 1991
An Act to establish Manx registers of merchant ships, small ships and fishing vessels; to repeal certain Acts of Parliament insofar as they extend to the Island or to ships registered in the Island; and for connected purposes.
Isle of Man Survey Act 1991	AT 16 of 1991	9 July 1991
An Act to facilitate the survey of the Isle of Man.
Trade Unions Act 1991	AT 20 of 1991	15 October 1991
An Act to make new provision relating to trade unions, employers’ associations and trade disputes; and for connected purposes.
Building Control Act 1991	AT 21 of 1991	15 October 1991
An Act to make new provision for the control of building and demolition; and for connected purposes.
Water Act 1991	AT 24 of 1991	15 October 1991
An Act to re-enact with amendments the enactments relating to water supply.
Criminal Justice Act 1991	AT 25 of 1991	15 October 1991
An Act to make new provision for evidence in criminal proceedings; to enable the review of sentences on the application of the Attorney General; to make new provision with respect to offensive weapons; to prohibit the supply to persons under the age of 18 of certain substances which may cause intoxication if inhaled; to make new provision for the service of process; to make new provision for forfeiture orders; to amend enactments relating to the misuse etc. of drugs; to make miscellaneous amendments to enactments relating to the criminal law; and for connected purposes.

=== 1992 ===
Short title, or popular name	Citation	Royal assent
Long title
Computer Security Act 1992	AT 1 of 1992	15 April 1992
An Act to make provision for securing computer material against unauthorised access or modification; and for connected purposes.
Contracts (Applicable Law) Act 1992	AT 2 of 1992	15 April 1992
An Act to make provision as to the law applicable to contractual obligations in the case of conflict of laws.
Companies Act 1992	AT 4 of 1992	16 June 1992
An Act to make provision for merger relief, merger accounting; financial assistance by a company for the acquisition of its own shares; the purchase by a company of its own shares; to make further amendments to the Companies Acts 1931 to 1986; and for connected purposes.
Church Act 1992	AT 5 of 1992	16 June 1992
An Act to amend the constitutions of the Sodor and Man Diocesan Board of Finance and the Church Commissioners for the Isle of Man; to vest certain functions of the Commissioners in the Board; to confer powers on the Board relating to ecclesiastical trusts; to amend the Pastoral Measure (Isle of Man) 1990; to make new provision for the disposal of land held for ecclesiastical purposes; to prescribe an age limit with respect to certain ecclesiastical offices; and for connected purposes.
Sexual Offences Act 1992 (repealed)	AT 6 of 1992	7 July 1992
An Act to make fresh provision for sexual offences; and for connected purposes.
Fire Precautions (Amendment) Act 1992	AT 7 of 1992	7 July 1992
An Act to amend the Fire Precautions Act 1975.
Chronically Sick and Disabled Persons (Amendment) Act 1992 (repealed)	AT 8 of 1992	7 July 1992
An Act to amend the Chronically Sick and Disabled Persons Act 1981
European Communities (Amendment) (No 2) Act 1992 (repealed)	AT 12 of 1992	15 December 1992
An Act to continue in force the European Communities (Amendment) Act 1991 as a permanent Act.
Currency Act 1992	AT 14 of 1992	15 December 1992
An Act to repeal and replace enactments relating to the currency of the Island; and for connected purposes.

=== 1993 ===
Short title, or popular name	Citation	Royal assent
Long title
Human Organ Transplants Act 1993	AT 3 of 1993	16 March 1993
An Act to prohibit commercial dealings in human organs intended for transplanting; to prohibit the transplanting of such organs between persons who are not genetically related; and for connected purposes.
Death Penalty Abolition Act 1993	AT 5 of 1993	31 March 1993
An Act to abolish capital punishment and for connected purposes.
Tree Preservation Act 1993	AT 6 of 1993	18 May 1993
An Act to make fresh provision for the preservation of trees.
Customs and Excise Act 1993	AT 7 of 1993	18 May 1993
An Act to consolidate with simplifications and amendments certain enactments relating to customs and excise etc; and for connected purposes.
Church Legislation Procedure Act 1993	AT 8 of 1993	7 July 1993
An Act to make new provision for legislation concerning the Church of England.
Criminal Jurisdiction Act 1993	AT 9 of 1993	16 June 1993
An Act to re-enact with amendments the enactments relating to Courts of General Gaol Delivery and appeals therefrom; and for connected purposes.
Access to Health Records and Reports Act 1993	AT 10 of 1993	16 June 1993
An Act to establish a right of access to health records; to provide for the correction of inaccurate health records; to establish a right of access to medical reports prepared for employment or insurance purposes; and for connected purposes.
Police Act 1993	AT 11 of 1993	7 July 1993
An Act to re-enact with amendments the enactments relating to the police; to make new provision for complaints against the police; and for connected purposes.
Broadcasting Act 1993 (repealed)	AT 12 of 1993	7 July 1993
An Act to make new provision for the licensing of certain programme services; to enable certain satellite services to be proscribed; to make further provision relating to copyright in connection with programme services; to require charges to be indicated on certain telecommunication apparatus; and for connected purposes.
Water Pollution Act 1993	AT 14 of 1993	7 July 1993
An Act to make new provision for the protection of inland and coastal waters from pollution; to control deposits in the sea; and for connected purposes.
Single Member Companies Act 1993	AT 15 of 1993	7 July 1993
An Act to permit the formation of private companies limited by shares or by guarantee; and for connected purposes.
Access to Neighbouring Land Act 1993	AT 16 of 1993	7 July 1993
An Act to enable persons who desire to carry out works to any land which are reasonably necessary for the preservation of that land to obtain access to neighbouring land in order to do so; and for purposes connected therewith.
Criminal Justice (Penalties Etc) Act 1993	AT 18 of 1993	19 October 1993
An Act to provide for increases in fines; to increase the penalty for indecent assaults; to amend the law relating to indecency with children; to amend the law relating to whipping; to amend the law relating to community service orders; to enable courts to impose combined probation and community service orders; to amend the law relating to the detention of juveniles; and for connected purposes.
Credit Unions Act 1993	AT 19 of 1993	19 October 1993
An Act to enable certain societies to be registered under the Industrial and Building Societies Act 1892 as credit unions; and to make further provision with respect to societies so registered.
Post Office Act 1993	AT 20 of 1993	14 December 1993
An Act to re-enact with amendments the enactments relating to postal services.

=== 1994 ===
Short title, or popular name	Citation	Royal assent
Long title
Shot Guns, Air Weapons and Cross-bows Act 1994	AT 2 of 1994	16 March 1994
An Act to regulate the possession, sale, use, etc., of shot guns, air weapons and cross-bows; and for connected purposes.
European Communities (Amendment) Act 1994	AT 10 of 1994	21 June 1994
An Act to make provision consequential on the Treaty on European Union signed at Maastricht on 7 February 1992; and to make provision in relation to the European Economic Area established under the Agreement signed at Oporto on 2 May 1992 as adjusted by the Protocol signed at Brussels on 17 March 1993.
Wildlife Etc (Amendment) Act 1994	AT 11 of 1994	12 July 1994
An Act to amend the Endangered Species (Import and Export) Act 1981; the Wildlife Act 1990; and for connected purposes.

=== 1995 ===
Short title, or popular name	Citation	Royal assent
Long title
Custody Act 1995	AT 1 of 1995	17 January 1995
An Act to re-enact with amendments certain enactments relating to the custody of offenders and others; to make fresh provision for such custody; and for connected purposes.
Maritime Security Act 1995	AT 5 of 1995	11 April 1995
An Act to give effect to the Convention for the Suppression of Unlawful Acts against the Safety of Maritime Navigation and to the Protocol for the Suppression of Unlawful Acts against the Safety of Fixed Platforms Located on the Continental Shelf which supplements that Convention; to make other provision for the protection of ships and harbour areas against acts of violence; and for connected purposes.
Gas Regulation Act 1995	AT 7 of 1995	11 July 1995
An Act to make new provision with respect to the supply of gas through pipes and certain related matters.
Licensing Act 1995	AT 8 of 1995	11 July 1995
An Act to re-enact with amendments the Licensing Acts; and for connected purposes.
Royal Bank of Scotland International Limited Act 1995	AT 10 of 1995	11 July 1995
An Act to carry into effect the transfer to The Royal Bank of Scotland International Limited of the undertaking of The Royal Bank of Scotland (I.O.M.) Limited; and for other purposes.
Pension Schemes Act 1995	AT 11 of 1995	18 October 1995
An Act to provide for the application to the Island of legislation relating to occupational pension schemes; and for connected purposes.
Income Tax Act 1995 (repealed)	AT 12 of 1995	18 October 1995
An Act to amend the Income Tax Acts; and for connected purposes.
Representation of the People Act 1995 (repealed)	AT 13 of 1995	18 October 1995
An Act to re-enact with amendments the Representation of the People Acts 1951 to 1990; and for connected purposes.
Termination of Pregnancy (Medical Defences) Act 1995 (repealed)	AT 14 of 1995	18 October 1995
An Act to provide statutory defences for medical practitioners who terminate pregnancies in certain circumstances; and for connected purposes.
Maintenance Orders (Reciprocal Enforcement) Act 1995	AT 15 of 1995	18 October 1995
An Act to re-enact with amendments the Maintenance Orders (Reciprocal Enforcement) Act 1978 and related enactments.
Advocates Act 1995	AT 17 of 1995	18 October 1995
An Act to repeal and replace with amendments enactments relating to the Isle of Man Law Society, advocates and advocates’ costs; to provide for the appointment of Notaries Public; to regulate the provision of advocates’ services in the case of incorporated practices; and for connected purposes.
Trusts Act 1995	AT 18 of 1995	12 December 1995
An Act to make further provision relating to the governing law of trusts; for the exclusion of foreign law in relation to trusts governed by Manx law; and for connected purposes.
Video Recordings Act 1995	AT 19 of 1995	12 December 1995
An Act to make provision for regulating the distribution of video recordings and for the registration of video recording suppliers; and for connected purposes.

=== 1996 ===
Short title, or popular name	Citation	Royal assent
Long title
Value Added Tax Act 1996	AT 1 of 1996	16 January 1996
An Act to consolidate with amendments the enactments relating to value added tax and the VAT and Duties Tribunal; to amend enactments relating to customs or excise; and for connected purposes.
Drug Trafficking Act 1996	AT 3 of 1996	16 April 1996
An Act to consolidate, with amendments and additions, the Drug Trafficking Offences Act 1987; and for connected purposes.
Law Reform (Miscellaneous Provisions) Act 1996	AT 5 of 1996	16 April 1996
An Act to amend the law relating to the form of powers of attorney and the delegation and exercise of certain functions by power of attorney; to amend the law relating to the distribution of estates of deceased persons; to make provision about the effect of the dissolution or annulment of marriage on wills and appointments of guardians; and to make further provision for charging certain assets to secure liabilities.
Opticians Act 1996	AT 6 of 1996	16 April 1996
An Act to impose restrictions on the testing of sight and the prescribing and supply of optical appliances; and for connected purposes.
Timeshare Act 1996	AT 7 of 1996	16 April 1996
An Act to provide for rights to cancel certain timeshare agreements; to require monies paid in respect of the use of timeshare accommodation to be paid to independent stake-holders; to enable the application and implementation of European Community instruments and international agreements relating to timeshare; and for connected purposes.
Food Act 1996	AT 8 of 1996	16 April 1996
An Act to make new provision in place of the Milk and Dairies Act 1950, the Food and Drugs Act 1963 and other enactments relating to food; to re-enact with amendments the enactments relating to slaughterhouses and knackers’ yards; and for connected purposes.
Purpose Trusts Act 1996	AT 9 of 1996	21 May 1996
An Act to make provision for the creation and validity of trusts for a purpose or purposes; and for connected purposes.
Performers' Protection Act 1996	AT 12 of 1996	21 May 1996
An Act to confer rights on performers and others in respect of performances of musical and dramatic works; to amend the Copyright Act 1991; and to make further provision as to the seizure and forfeiture of counterfeit and pirated goods.
Territorial Sea (Rights to Coal) Act 1996 (repealed)	AT 13 of 1996	21 May 1996
An Act to vest in the Department of Industry the coal under the extended territorial sea of the Isle of Man, and for other purposes.
Electricity Act 1996	AT 14 of 1996	18 June 1996
An Act to make new provision with respect to the supply of electricity in the Isle of Man; and for connected purposes.
Fair Trading Act 1996	AT 15 of 1996	18 June 1996
An Act to enable action to be taken against conduct detrimental to consumers and anti-competitive practices; to enable prices to be investigated; and for connected purposes.
Supply of Goods and Services Act 1996	AT 16 of 1996	18 June 1996
An Act to re-enact with amendments the enactments relating to terms implied in contracts for the supply of goods and services; to amend the Sale of Goods Act 1983 and the Moneylenders Act 1991; and for connected purposes.
Criminal Justice Act 1996	AT 17 of 1996	9 July 1996
An Act to amend the criminal law; to amend enactments relating to the confiscation etc. of the proceeds of crime; and for connected purposes.
Limited Liability Companies Act 1996	AT 19 of 1996	9 July 1996
An Act to provide for the establishment of limited liability companies; for the taxation of such companies; and for other purposes.
Merchant Shipping (Miscellaneous Provisions) Act 1996	AT 20 of 1996	9 July 1996
An Act to make new provision for the carriage of goods by sea; to implement the International Convention on Salvage 1989; to amend enactments relating to safety of life at sea, marine pollution and merchant shipping; and for connected purposes.
Tourism (Registration and Grading) Act 1996	AT 21 of 1996	9 July 1996
An Act to establish the Tourism Registration and Grading Commission; to make provision for the transfer of certain functions from the Department of Tourism and Leisure; and for connected purposes.
Animal Health Act 1996	AT 22 of 1996	15 October 1996
An Act to repeal and replace the Diseases of Animals Acts 1948 to 1975 and certain related enactments; to make provision for animal health and welfare; and for connected purposes.
Livestock (Import and Export Statistics) Act 1996	AT 23 of 1996	15 October 1996
An Act to enable the Department of Agriculture, Fisheries and Forestry to obtain more readily the information necessary for the appreciation of trends in the import and export of livestock and for the discharge of its functions; for the dissemination of information in the form of statistics; and for connected purposes.

=== 1997 ===
Short title, or popular name	Citation	Royal assent
Long title
Law Reform Act 1997	AT 1 of 1997	17 June 1997
An Act to make provision for choice of law rules in tort; to amend the law relating to defamation; to make new provision in relation to damages for personal injury, including injury resulting in death; to make provision about interest on judgment debts and awards; to make further provision for the appointment and retirement of trustees; to amend the law relating to covenants in conveyances of land; to enable provision with respect to pension benefits to be made in matrimonial proceedings; to transfer certain functions to the Chief Registrar; and for connected purposes.
Lloyds TSB Act 1997 (repealed)	AT 2 of 1997	17 June 1997
An Act to carry into effect the transfer to and vesting in Lloyds TSB Bank (Isle of Man) Limited of the undertakings of Lloyds Bank Plc and TSB Bank plc; and for connected purposes.
National Westminster Bank Plc Act 1997	AT 3 of 1997	17 June 1997
An Act to transfer the Isle of Man undertaking of National Westminster Bank Plc to NatWest Offshore Limited; and for Connected purposes
Statute Law Revision Act 1997	AT 4 of 1997	26 June 1997
An Act to make minor amendments to certain enactments; to repeal certain spent and obsolete enactments; and for connected purposes.
Cruelty to Animals Act 1997	AT 5 of 1997	15 July 1997
An Act to consolidate with amendments certain enactments relating to the prevention of cruelty to animals; to make new provision with respect to the protection of animals used for scientific procedures; and for connected purposes.

=== 1998 ===
Short title, or popular name	Citation	Royal assent
Long title
Recreation and Leisure Act 1998	AT 1 of 1998	20 January 1998
An Act to confer on the Department for Enterprise and the Department of Education, Sport and Culture powers to provide recreational and cultural facilities; to enable such powers to be conferred on local authorities; and for connected purposes.
Insider Dealing Act 1998	AT 2 of 1998	17 February 1998
An Act to repeal and replace legislation relating to the regulation of insider dealing; and for connected purposes.
Mental Health Act 1998	AT 3 of 1998	17 March 1998
An Act to re-enact with amendments the law relating to mentally disordered persons.
Brewers (Amendment) Act 1998	AT 5 of 1998	28 April 1998
An Act to amend the Brewers’ Act 1874 to extend the definition of ‘beer’ for the purposes of that Act, to repeal unnecessary provisions; to enable the Treasury to grant certain exemptions from that Act; and for connected purposes.
Companies (Transfer of Domicile) Act 1998	AT 6 of 1998	28 April 1998
An Act to permit the continuation and discontinuation of companies; and for connected purposes.
Agriculture and Fisheries (Miscellaneous Provisions) Act 1998	AT 7 of 1998	16 June 1998
An Act to make it an offence to make false statements to obtain subsidies, etc; to amend the Sea-Fisheries Act 1971, the Wild Animals (Restriction on Importation, Etc.) Act 1980 and the Animal Health Act 1996; and for connected purposes.
Police Powers and Procedures Act 1998	AT 9 of 1998	16 June 1998
An Act to make provision in relation to the powers and duties of the police; persons in police detention; evidence in criminal proceedings; and for connected purposes.
Bankruptcy Act 1988	AT 10 of 1998	15 April 1988
An Act to provide for co-operation between the High Court and courts exercising bankruptcy jurisdiction in other countries and to amend the Bankruptcy Acts 1892 to 1903.
Criminal Justice (Exclusion of Non-Resident Offenders) Act 1998	AT 10 of 1998	14 July 1998
An Act to enable criminal courts to make orders excluding certain non-resident offenders from the Island; and for connected purposes.
Public Order Act 1998	AT 11 of 1998	20 October 1998
An Act to create new offences relating to public order; and for connected purposes.

=== 1999 ===
Short title, or popular name	Citation	Royal assent
Long title
Sewerage Act 1999	AT 2 of 1999	16 February 1999
An Act to make new provision for the construction and maintenance of sewers and sewage disposal works, the drainage of premises and the disposal of trade effluent; and for connected purposes.
Statistics Act 1999	AT 5 of 1999	18 May 1999
An Act to repeal and replace the Revenue Returns Act 1894; to enable the Treasury to obtain more readily the information necessary for the appreciation of economic trends for the more effective discharge of the functions of the Treasury; for the dissemination of information in the form of statistics; and for connected purposes.
National Lottery Act 1999	AT 6 of 1999	15 June 1999
An Act to authorize the promotion of the National Lottery in the Island; to enable the application to the Island of the National Lottery etc. Act 1993 (an Act of Parliament) and associated legislation; to amend legislation relating to lotteries; and for connected purposes.
Estate Agents Act 1999	AT 7 of 1999	13 July 1999
An Act to prohibit the making of false or misleading statements about property matters in the course of business as an estate agent; to amend the Estate Agents Act 1975; and for connected purposes.
Public Records Act 1999	AT 8 of 1999	13 July 1999
An Act to establish a Public Record Office; to make provision for public records; and for connected purposes.
Town and Country Planning Act 1999	AT 9 of 1999	19 October 1999
An Act to make new provision with respect to town and country planning, including the protection of buildings and areas of special architectural or historic interest and the control of advertisements; and for connected purposes.
Copyright (Amendment) Act 1999	AT 12 of 1999	14 December 1999
An Act to amend the Copyright Act 1991 and the Performers’ Protection Act 1996; to make further amendments of the law relating to intellectual property; to amend the law relating to rights in databases; and for connected purposes.
Villa Marina Act 1999	AT 13 of 1999	14 December 1999
An Act to make provision for the vesting of the title to the Villa Marina; and for connected purposes.

== 21st century ==
=== 2000 ===
Short title, or popular name	Citation	Royal assent
Long title
Douglas Head Act 2000	AT 1 of 2000	15 February 2000
An Act to make new provision for certain land at Douglas Head; and for connected purposes.
Companies (Transfer of Functions) Act 2000	AT 3 of 2000	21 March 2000
An Act to transfer certain functions relating to the registration of companies, partnerships and other entities to the Financial Supervision Commission; and for other purposes.
Social Security Act 2000	AT 5 of 2000	2 March 2000
An Act to provide for the application to the Island of certain Acts of Parliament and statutory instruments relating to social security; and for connected purposes.
Income Tax Act 2000 (repealed)	AT 6 of 2000	20 June 2000
An Act to amend the Income Tax Act 1970; to confirm certain temporary taxation orders; and for connected purposes.
Shops Act 2000	AT 7 of 2000	20 June 2000
An Act to abolish the regulation of shop hours on Sundays; to make new provisions for the rights of shop workers as respects opening on Sundays, etc; and for connected purposes.
Electronic Transactions Act 2000	AT 8 of 2000	20 June 2000
An Act to facilitate electronic transactions, and for connected purposes.
Online Gambling Regulation Act 2001	AT 10 of 2000	15 May 2001
An Act to provide for the regulation of certain forms of gambling carried on by means of telecommunications; and for connected purposes.
Police (Amendment) Act 2000	AT 11 of 2000	11 July 2000
An Act to amend the Police Act 1993.
Protection from Harassment Act 2000	AT 12 of 2000	17 October 2000
An Act to make provision for protecting persons from harassment and similar conduct; and for connected purposes.
Retirement Benefits Schemes Act 2000	AT 14 of 2000	17 October 2000
An Act to make new provision for the registration, authorisation, recognition, regulation and supervision of certain retirement benefits schemes and for connected purposes.
Employment (Sex Discrimination) Act 2000 (repealed)	AT 16 of 2000	17 October 2000
An Act to prevent discrimination between men and women in relation to employment.
Road Transport Act 2001	AT 27 of 2000	12 July 2001
An Act to make new provision for regulating the transport of passengers and goods by road; and for connected purposes.

=== 2001 ===
Short title, or popular name	Citation	Royal assent
Long title
Halifax International Act 2001	AT 1 of 2001	15 May 2001
An Act to carry into effect the transfer to and vesting in Halifax International Limited of the undertaking of Halifax International (Isle of Man) Limited; and for connected purposes.
Human Rights Act 2001	AT 1 of 2001	16 January 2001
An Act to give further effect to rights and freedoms guaranteed under the European Convention on Human Rights; and for connected purposes.
Contracts (Rights of Third Parties) Act 2001	AT 2 of 2001	19 February 200
An Act to make provision for the enforcement of contractual terms by third parties.
Criminal Justice Act 2001	AT 4 of 2001	20 March 2001
An Act to amend the criminal law; and for connected purposes.
Rehabilitation of Offenders Act 2001	AT 6 of 2001	20 March 2001
An Act to rehabilitate offenders who have not been reconvicted of any serious offence for periods of years; to penalise the publication, etc. of their previous convictions; and for connected purposes.
Residence Act 2001	AT 7 of 2001	20 March 2001
An Act to provide for the registration of residents; regulating residence in the Island; and for connected purposes.
Genetically Modified Organisms Act 2001	AT 13 of 2001	15 May 2001
An Act to restrict the import, acquisition, keeping, release and marketing in the Isle of Man of genetically modified organisms.
National Health Service Act 2001	AT 14 of 2001	15 May 2001
An Act to re-enact with amendments the enactments relating to health services.
Income Tax Act 2001 (repealed)	AT 15 of 2001	15 May 2001
An Act to amend the Income Tax Acts; to confirm a certain temporary taxation order; and for connected purposes.
Trustee Act 2001	AT 18 of 2001	19 June 2001
An Act to amend the law relating to trustees and persons having the investment powers of trustees; and for connected purposes.
Children and Young Persons Act 2001	AT 20 of 2001	10 July 2001
An Act to re-enact Parts I and II of the Family Law Act 1991; to reform the law relating to children; to provide for social services for children in danger and in need; to provide for the regulation of fostering; to make new provision for human fertilisation, embryology and surrogacy; and for connected purposes.
Gaming, Betting and Lotteries (Amendment) Act 2001	AT 22 of 2001	10 July 2001
An Act to amend the Gaming, Betting and Lotteries Act 1988 and the Gaming (Amendment) Act 1984.
Minimum Wage Act 2001	AT 25 of 2001	10 July 2001
An Act to make provision for and in connection with a minimum wage; to amend the Agricultural Wages Act 1952; and for connected purposes.
Civil Jurisdiction Act 2001	AT 28 of 2001	15 October 2001
An Act to make further provision about the civil jurisdiction of courts in the Island; about the recognition and enforcement of judgments given in the Island or elsewhere; about the civil law; about legal practitioners; and for connected purposes.
Royal Bank of Scotland International Limited Act 2001	AT 30 of 2001	15 October 2001
An Act to carry into effect the acquisition of certain of the businesses of NatWest Offshore Limited and the banking business of Coutts (Isle of Man) Limited by The Royal Bank of Scotland International Limited and to provide for other purposes incidental thereto and consequential thereon.
Road Traffic (Amendment) Act 2001 (repealed)	AT 32 of 2001	15 October 2001
An Act to amend the Road Traffic Act 1985, the Road Traffic Regulation Act 1985, the Licensing and Registration of Vehicles Act 1985 and the Highways Act 1986.
Education Act 2001	AT 33 of 2001	15 October 2001
An Act to make new provision for education; and for connected purposes.

=== 2002 ===
Short title, or popular name	Citation	Royal assent
Long title
Barclays Private Clients International Act 2002	AT 1 of 2002	10 July 2002
An Act to carry into effect the transfer to, and vesting in, Barclays Finance Company (Isle of Man) Limited of the undertaking or part or parts of the undertaking of the Isle of Man branch of Barclays Bank PLC; to provide for the acceptance by Barclays Finance Company (Isle of Man) Limited of the transfer to, and vesting in, it of the undertakings or part or parts of the undertakings of the Jersey and Guernsey branches of Barclays Bank PLC and the undertakings or part or parts of the undertakings of each of Barclays Bank Finance Company (Jersey) Limited, Barclays Finance Company (Guernsey) Limited and Woolwich Guernsey Limited; and for connected purposes.
Data Protection Act 2002 (repealed)	AT 2 of 2002	10 December 2002
An Act to make new provision for the regulation of the processing of information relating to individuals, including the obtaining, holding, use or disclosure of such information.

=== 2003 ===
Short title, or popular name	Citation	Royal assent
Long title
Medicines Act 2003	AT 4 of 2003	8 April 2003
An Act to make new provision for regulating the import, manufacture, sale and supply of and other dealings with medicinal products and veterinary medicinal products; and for connected purposes.
Submarine Cables Act 2003	AT 5 of 2003	20 May 2003
An Act to regulate the placing of cables in the territorial waters of the Isle of Man; and to make further provision in relation to such cables.
Anti-Terrorism and Crime Act 2003	AT 6 of 2003	20 May 2003
An Act to repeal and replace the Prevention of Terrorism Act 1990 and to make further provision about terrorism and criminal justice.
Matrimonial Proceedings Act 2003	AT 7 of 2003	17 June 2003
An Act to re-enact with amendments certain enactments relating to matrimonial proceedings and property; to make new provision for family homes and domestic violence; and for connected purposes.
Inquiries (Evidence) Act 2003	AT 8 of 2003	17 June 2003
An Act to make provision for evidence, representation and attendance at inquiries, the costs of and incidental to inquiries, and for connected purposes.
International Criminal Court Act 2003	AT 9 of 2003	17 June 2003
An Act to give effect to the Statute of the International Criminal Court; to provide for offences under the law of the Island corresponding to offences within the jurisdiction of that Court; and for connected purposes.
Income Tax Act 2003	AT 11 of 2003	22 October 2003
An Act to introduce Personal Allowance Credit; to provide for confidential information and the supply and use of that information; to provide for the implementation of international information exchange agreements; to make certain amendments to the Income Tax Acts; and for connected purposes.
Gas and Electricity Act 2003	AT 12 of 2003	22 October 2003
An Act to enable the Manx Utilities Authority to supply gas, to provide telecommunication services and to export electricity; to make further provision as to the finances of the Authority; and for connected purposes.
Heath Burning Act 2003	AT 15 of 2003	22 October 2003
An Act to make fresh provision for heath burning and for the management of heathland.
Companies, etc (Amendment) Act 2003	AT 16 of 2003	9 December 2003
An Act to amend the law relating to companies, etc; and for connected purposes.
Income Tax Act 1991	AT 17 of 2003	15 October 1991
An Act to amend the Income Tax Acts.

=== 2004 ===
Short title, or popular name	Citation	Royal assent
Long title
Protected Cell Companies Act 2004	AT 1 of 2004	21 January 2004
An Act to provide for the incorporation of companies as protected cell companies; for the conversion of companies into protected cell companies; and for connected purposes.
Construction Contracts Act 2004	AT 2 of 2004	17 February 2004
An Act to amend the law relating to construction contracts.
Life Assurance (Insurable Interests) Act 2004	AT 3 of 2004	17 March 2004
An Act to make further provision with respect to the distribution of functions between the Insurance and Pensions Authority and of the Supervisor; to amend supervisory powers; to amend the Insurance Act 1986, the Retirement Benefits Schemes Act 2000 and the Insurance Intermediaries (General Business) Act 1996; and for connected purposes.
Income Tax (Amendment) Act 2004 (repealed)	AT 5 of 2004	15 June 2004
An Act to change the assessment base for non-corporate taxpayers; to introduce civil penalties in respect of late tax returns; to confer powers on the Assessor to obtain documents, information and accounts; to provide certain anti-avoidance measures; to permit the grant of personal relief to non-residents; to amend provisions relating to temporary tax orders; to make minor and supplementary amendments to the Income Tax Acts; and for connected purposes.
Race Relations Act 2004 (repealed)	AT 6 of 2004	15 June 2004
An Act to impose a duty on public authorities to exercise their functions in a manner that promotes good race relations; to make discrimination on grounds of colour, race, nationality or ethnic or national origin unlawful in the Isle of Man; and for connected purposes.
Fireworks Act 2004	AT 9 of 2004	19 October 2004
An Act to restrict the sale and use of fireworks; and for connected purposes.

=== 2005 ===
Short title, or popular name	Citation	Royal assent
Long title
Veterinary Surgeons Act 2005	AT 1 of 2005	15 March 2005
An Act to make provision for restricting the practice of veterinary surgery by unqualified persons; and for connected purposes.
Trees and High Hedges Act 2005	AT 3 of 2005	22 June 2005
An Act to make provision for dealing with complaints about trees and high hedges; and for connected purposes.
Housing (Multi-Occupancy) Act 2005	AT 4 of 2005	13 July 2005
An Act to make provision for the control of dwellings in multiple occupation; to amend the Housing Act 1955; and for connected purposes.
Fiduciary Services Act 2005	AT 5 of 2005	13 July 2005
An Act to amend the Corporate Service Providers Act 2000 to provide for the licensing, regulation and supervision of certain persons who act as trustees or partners or provide certain services in relation to trusts and partnerships; and for connected purposes.
Coastline Management Act 2005	AT 6 of 2005	18 October 2005
An Act to make provision for the management of designated coastline zones, to regulate development in such zones; to confer functions on the Department of Transport in respect of such zones; to modify the effect of enactments relating to town and country planning in respect of such zones; and for connected purposes.

=== 2006 ===
Short title, or popular name	Citation	Royal assent
Long title
Tribunals Act 2006	AT 1 of 2006	21 March 2006
An Act to make new provision for the appointment, tenure of office and proceedings of certain tribunals.
Mental Health (Amendment) Act 2006	AT 2 of 2006	25 April 2006
An Act to amend the law relating to the transfer of patients between the Island and other countries; to abolish directions that persons be detained during Her Majesty’s pleasure; to amend the constitution of the Mental Health Review Tribunal; to amend the law relating to the nearest relatives of patients; and for connected purposes.
Income Tax (Amendment) Act 2006 (repealed)	AT 4 of 2006	11 July 2006
An Act to introduce a corporate charge; to amend the law relating to the taxation of married couples; to make new provision for a charge on the distributable profits of companies; to change the law relating to the taxation of non-residents; to amend the law relating to the setting of rates of income tax; to make provision with respect to discounts on securities; to make miscellaneous amendments to the Income Tax Acts; and for connected purposes.
Income Tax (Corporate Taxpayers) Act 2006	AT 8 of 2006	11 July 2006
An Act to amend the Income Tax Acts in respect of the taxation of corporate taxpayers; and for connected purposes.
Insurance Companies (Amalgamations) Act 2006	AT 11 of 2006	12 July 2006
An Act to enable the Treasury by order to make provision for the amalgamation of insurance companies; and for connected purposes.
Noise Act 2006	AT 12 of 2006	10 July 1990
An Act to carry into effect the transfer to NatWest International Trust Corporation (Isle of Man) Limited of the undertakings of Westminster Bank Executor and Trustee Company (Isle of Man) Limited and NatWest International Trust Corporation (Man) Limited; and for other purposes.
Registration of Electors Act 2006 (repealed)	AT 12 of 2006	12 July 2006
An Act to repeal and replace the enactments relating to the franchise and registration of electors; to amend the law relating to the preparation of registers of electors; and for connected purposes.
Companies Act 2006	AT 13 of 2006	16 October 2006
An Act to provide for the incorporation, management and operation of different types of companies, for the relationships between companies and their directors and members and to provide for connected and consequential matters.
National Health and Care Service Act 2016	AT 13 of 2006	19 July 2016
An Act to provide for national health and care services; to make provision for private care; and for connected purposes.
Agricultural Marketing (Amendment) Act 2006	AT 14 of 2006	16 October 2006
An Act to provide for the functions of the Isle of Man Agricultural Marketing Society, the Fat Stock Marketing Association and the Milk Marketing Association to be transferred to companies; and for connected purposes.
Audit Act 2006	AT 15 of 2006	16 October 2006
An Act to make new provision for the audit of accounts of public bodies; to amend the law relating to the audit of charities; and for connected purposes.
Constitution Act 2006	AT 16 of 2006	16 October 2006
An Act to enable a Bill passed by the Keys alone to be passed as an Act of Tynwald.
Disability Discrimination Act 2006 (repealed)	AT 17 of 2006	16 October 2006
An Act to make it unlawful to discriminate against disabled persons in connection with the provision of goods, facilities and services and the disposal or management of premises; and for connected purposes.
Local Government Act 2006	AT 18 of 2006	16 October 2006
An Act to amend certain enactments relating to local government; to make further provision as to local government finance; to amend the Town and Country Planning Act 1999; and for connected purposes.
Public Health (Tobacco) Act 2006	AT 19 of 2006	16 October 2006
An Act to control the advertising and promotion of tobacco products; to prohibit smoking in certain wholly or substantially enclosed places; and for connected purposes.
Sex Offenders Act 2006 (repealed)	AT 20 of 2006	16 October 2006
An Act to amend the law relating to sexual offenders; and for connected purposes.
Employment Act 2006	AT 21 of 2006	12 December 2006
An Act to consolidate enactments relating to employment rights; to confer new rights on employees and workers; and for connected purposes.
Gambling (Amendment) Act 2006	AT 22 of 2006	12 December 2006
An Act to amend Acts relating to the regulation of gambling; to change the name of the Isle of Man Gambling Control Commissioners; to transfer functions from the Department of Home Affairs; and for connected purposes.
Regulation of Surveillance etc. Act 2006	AT 23 of 2006	12 December 2006
An Act to make new provision for the regulation of surveillance by investigating authorities; the use of covert intelligence sources; and for connected purposes.
Road Traffic (Amendment) Act 2006 (repealed)	AT 24 of 2006	12 December 2006
An Act to amend enactments relating to road traffic and its regulation, road transport, highways and the licensing and registration of vehicles; and for connected purposes.

=== 2007 ===
Short title, or popular name	Citation	Royal assent
Long title
Civil Service (Amendment) Act 2007 (repealed)	AT 2 of 2007	19 June 2007
An Act to amend the constitution of the Civil Service Commission; to extend the power of the Chief Minister to give directions to the Commission; to require the Commission to submit reports to the Chief Minister; to make certain officers ineligible for membership of departments, statutory boards and certain public bodies; and for connected purposes.
Criminal Justice, Police and Courts Act 2007	AT 3 of 2007	11 July 2007
An Act to make new provision relating to criminal justice, the police, criminal courts and emergency powers; to amend enactments relating to those matters; and for other purposes.
Merchant Shipping (Amendment) Act 2007	AT 4 of 2007	11 July 2007
An Act to provide for the implementation of International Labour Organization Conventions; for the registration of vessels under construction; for the authorisation of representative persons; and for connected purposes.
Personal Liability (Ministers, Members and Officers) Act 2007	AT 7 of 2007	16 October 2007
An Act to make provision with respect to the personal liability of members of departments and statutory boards, public officers and certain others; and for connected purposes.

=== 2008 ===
Short title, or popular name	Citation	Royal assent
Long title
Prisoner Escorts Act 2008	AT 1 of 2008	19 February 2008
An Act to make new provision relating to prisoner escorts and for connected purposes.
Income Tax (Amendment) Act 2008 (repealed)	AT 4 of 2008	11 March 2008
An Act to make miscellaneous amendments to the Income Tax Acts; and for connected purposes.
Income Tax (Pensions) Act 2008 (repealed)	AT 6 of 2008	20 May 2008
An Act to amend the law relating to income tax in respect of retirement benefits schemes; and for connected purposes.
Collective Investment Schemes Act 2008	AT 7 of 2008	17 June 2008
An Act to repeal and replace with modifications the Financial Supervision Act 1988; and for connected purposes.
Financial Services Act 2008	AT 8 of 2008	17 June 2008
An Act to repeal and replace with modifications certain enactments relating to the financial services industry and the Isle of Man Financial Services Authority; and for connected purposes.
Corruption Act 2008 (repealed)	AT 10 of 2008	16 July 2008
An Act to amend the law relating to the prevention of corruption and for connected purposes.
Proceeds of Crime Act 2008	AT 13 of 2008	21 October 2008
An Act to allow the recovery of property which is or represents property obtained through unlawful conduct or which is intended to be used in unlawful conduct; to provide for confiscation orders in relation to persons who benefit from criminal conduct and for restraint orders to prohibit dealing with property; to make provision about money laundering; to make provision about investigations relating to benefit from criminal conduct or to property which is or represents property obtained through unlawful conduct or to money laundering; to make provision concerning the importation and exportation of cash; to make provision to give effect to overseas requests and orders made where property is found or believed to be obtained through criminal conduct; to make provision for hearing evidence through television or telephone links, for obtaining evidence for use outside the Island and for the transfer of prisoners to assist in investigations; to make miscellaneous modifications to certain enactments; and for connected purposes.
Administration of Justice Act 2008	AT 14 of 2008	21 October 2008
An Act to make new provision with respect to the judges of the High Court; to modernise the law relating to the admission of hearsay evidence in civil proceedings; to amend enactments relating to civil proceedings and the administration of justice; and for connected purposes.
Agricultural Tenancies Act 2008	AT 15 of 2008	21 October 2008
An Act to make further provision with respect to tenancies which include agricultural land.
Insurance Act 2008	AT 16 of 2008	21 October 2008
An Act to re-enact with amendments certain enactments relating to the regulation of persons carrying on insurance business and the regulation of insurance managers and insurance intermediaries; and for connected purposes.
Enterprise Act 2008	AT 17 of 2008	18 November 2008
An Act to confer functions on the Department of Trade and Industry to facilitate the promotion and development of the Island’s economy; to repeal the Industry Board Act 1981; and for connected purposes.

=== 2009 ===
Short title, or popular name	Citation	Royal assent
Long title
Income Tax Act 2009 (repealed)	AT 2 of 2009	21 April 2009
An Act to confirm certain temporary taxation orders; to amend the Income Tax Acts; and for connected purposes.
Education (Miscellaneous Provisions) Act 2009	AT 3 of 2009	21 April 2009
An Act to dissolve the Isle of Man Board of Education; and to amend the Education Act 2001.
Company Officers (Disqualification) Act 2009	AT 4 of 2009	21 April 2009
An Act to amend the law relating to the disqualification of persons for being officers of companies and for being otherwise concerned with a company’s affairs; and for connected purposes.
Terrorism (Finance) Act 2009 (repealed)	AT 8 of 2009	15 July 2009
An Act to confer new and further powers to act against terrorist financing, money laundering and certain other activities; and for connected purposes.
Social Security (Amendment) Act 2009	AT 10 of 2009	17 November 2009
An Act to amend the Social Security Act 2000; and for connected purposes.
Gender Recognition Act 2009	AT 11 of 2009	17 November 2009
An Act to make provision for and in connection with change of gender; and for connected purposes.

=== 2010 ===
Short title, or popular name	Citation	Royal assent
Long title
Prohibition of Female Genital Mutilation Act 2010	AT 2 of 2010	16 March 2010
An Act to prohibit female genital mutilation; and for connected purposes.
Lloyds TSB Offshore Limited Banking Business Act 2010	AT 4 of 2010	16 March 2010
An Act to carry into effect the transfer to, and vesting in, the Isle of Man branch of Lloyds TSB Offshore Limited of the undertaking or part or parts of the undertaking of the Isle of Man branch of Bank of Scotland plc; and for connected purposes.
Organised and International Crime Act 2010	AT 6 of 2010	13 July 2010
An Act to give effect, as part of the law of the Island, to the United Nations Convention against Transnational Organized Crime adopted by the General Assembly of the United Nations and opened for signature in Palermo in 2000 and the Protocols to that Convention to Prevent, Suppress and Punish Trafficking in Persons and Against the Smuggling of Migrants; to amend the International Criminal Court Act 2003; to make amendments to the Telecommunications Act 1984 and the Proceeds of Crime Act 2008; and for connected purposes.
Endangered Species Act 2010	AT 7 of 2010	19 October 2010
An Act to give effect to the Convention on International Trade in Endangered Species of Wild Fauna and Flora; and for connected purposes.
Gambling Supervision Act 2010	AT 8 of 2010	19 October 2010
An Act to make further provision for the status, constitution and functions of the Isle of Man Gambling Supervision Commission; to make further provision as to appeals from the Commission; to amend the Online Gambling Regulation Act 2001; and for connected purposes.
Harbours Act 2010	AT 9 of 2010	19 October 2010
An Act to re-enact with amendments certain enactments relating to the management, control, operation, maintenance, development and improvement of harbours; to provide for the charging of dues and the making of other charges; to provide for the registration and operation of certain vessels; to make new provision to prohibit persons living on board certain vessels within harbour limits; to make new provision for compulsory insurance in respect of vessels; to make new provision to deal with the presence of alcohol and drugs on board vessels; and for connected purposes.
Electricity (Amendment) Act 2010 (repealed)	AT 10 of 2010	19 October 2010
An Act to amend the Electricity Act 1996; and for connected purposes.
Income Tax Act 2010 (repealed)	AT 12 of 2010	14 December 2010
An Act to confirm the Income Tax (Australia) (Double Taxation) (Temporary Taxation) Order 2009 and the Income Tax (Individuals) (Temporary Taxation) Order 2009; and for connected purposes.
Incorporated Cell Companies Act 2010	AT 13 of 2010	14 December 2010
An Act to provide for the incorporation of companies as incorporated cell companies and incorporated cells; for the conversion of companies into incorporated cell companies and incorporated cells; and for connected purposes.

=== 2011 ===
Short title, or popular name	Citation	Royal assent
Long title
Criminal Justice (Witness Anonymity) Act 2011	AT 1 of 2011	18 January 2011
An Act to provide for orders to secure the anonymity of witnesses in criminal proceedings; and for connected purposes.
Civil Partnership Act 2011	AT 2 of 2011	15 March 2011
An Act to make provision for civil partnership; to make minor amendments in respect of adoption; and for connected purposes.
Marriage and Civil Registration (Amendment) Act 2011	AT 3 of 2011	12 April 2011
An Act to amend the Marriage Act 1984; to simplify marriage procedures; to enable civil marriages to be solemnised in places and circumstances approved by the Chief Registrar; to amend the Civil Registration Act 1984; to abolish registration districts; to make provision about the jurisdiction of the High Court in divorce; and for connected purposes.
Sewerage (Amendment) Act 2011	AT 5 of 2011	12 July 2011
An Act to amend the Sewerage Act 1999; and for connected purposes.
Anti-Terrorism and Crime (Amendment) Act 2011	AT 6 of 2011	12 July 2011
An Act to amend further the Anti-Terrorism and Crime Act 2003; to make minor amendments to other related legislation; and for connected purposes
Income Tax Act 2011	AT 10 of 2011	12 October 2011
An Act to confirm certain temporary taxation orders and to amend the Income Tax Act 1970.
Tynwald Auditor General Act 2011	AT 12 of 2011	12 October 2011
An Act to make provision for the appointment and functions of the Tynwald Auditor General; to amend the Audit Act 2006; and for connected purposes.
Tynwald Commissioner for Administration Act 2011	AT 13 of 2011	12 October 2011
An Act to make provision for the appointment and functions of the Tynwald Commissioner for Administration; and for connected purposes.
Broadway Baptist Church Act 2011	AT 15 of 2011	12 October 2011
An Act to transfer the functions and assets of the Broadway Baptist Church Trust, the Alpha Centre Trust and the Well Trust to Broadway Baptist Church (a company limited by guarantee); and for connected purposes.
Foundations Act 2011	AT 17 of 2011	11 November 2011
An Act to provide for the establishment of foundations.
Public Sector Pensions Act 2011	AT 18 of 2011	11 November 2011
An Act to establish the Public Sector Pensions Authority; to make new provision for the superannuation of persons in the public service; and for connected purposes.
Housing (Miscellaneous Provisions) Act 2011	AT 19 of 2011	11 November 2011
An Act to make fresh provision about assistance for the purchase and improvement of homes and the preservation of historic buildings; to make further provision about housing and about leasehold premises; and for connected purposes.
Breastfeeding Act 2011 (repealed)	AT 20 of 2011	11 November 2011
An Act to make provision about the feeding of milk to babies in public places and on licensed premises.
Financial Provisions and Currency Act 2011	AT 21 of 2011	12 December 2011
An Act to authorise the making of schemes appropriating sums from the General Revenue and other reserves or funds maintained by the Treasury; to validate certain existing schemes; to confer further powers on the Treasury to promote the economic, social and environmental well-being of the Island; to clarify the Treasury’s financial powers; to make minor amendments to the Currency Act 1992; and for connected purposes.
Social Services Act 2011	AT 22 of 2011	12 December 2011
An Act to make further provision for social care services and provision for carer support; and for connected purposes.

=== 2012 ===
Short title, or popular name	Citation	Royal assent
Long title
Debt Recovery and Enforcement Act 2012	AT 1 of 2012	9 February 2012
An Act to provide for the licensing of debt collectors; to provide certain powers in respect of the recovery of debts; and for connected purposes.
Road Traffic and Highways (Miscellaneous Amendments) Act 2012 (repealed)	AT 3 of 2012	19 June 2012
An Act to amend further various enactments connect with road traffic and highways; and for connected purposes.
Casino (Amendment) Act 2012 (repealed)	AT 4 of 2012	16 October 2012
An Act to amend the Casino Act 1986 to make provision for the holder of a casino licence to obtain a temporary premises certificate enabling gaming to take place on specified premises for a specified period; to make minor and consequential amendments to the Casino Act 1986, the Gaming, Betting and Lotteries Act 1988 and other enactments; and for connected purposes.
Fisheries Act 2012	AT 5 of 2012	9 July 2012
An Act to re-enact with amendments and further provisions the enactments relating to inland and sea fisheries; and for connected purposes.
Gambling Duty Act 2012	AT 6 of 2012	16 October 2012
An Act to make new and consolidated provision for the administration of excise duty on gambling; and for connected purposes.
Partnership (Amendment) Act 2012 (repealed)	AT 8 of 2012	16 October 2012
An Act to amend the Partnership Act 1909 in respect of the accounting requirements for limited partnerships.
Companies (Beneficial Ownership) Act 2012 (repealed)	AT 9 of 2012	11 December 2012
An Act to require certain companies to appoint nominated officers to hold information about beneficial owners of such companies; to require members of such companies to provide information concerning beneficial ownership to nominated officers; and for connected purposes.
Company and Business Names etc Act 2012	AT 10 of 2012	11 December 2012
An Act to make provision about the names of certain bodies and businesses; and for connected purposes.
Heavily Indebted Poor Countries (Limitation on Debt Recovery) Act 2012	AT 11 of 2012	11 December 2012
An Act to limit the recovery of certain debts against certain poor countries and territories; and for connected purposes.

=== 2013 ===
Short title, or popular name	Citation	Royal assent
Long title
Law Officers Act 2013 (repealed)	AT 1 of 2013	15 January 2013
An Act to make provision about the discharge of the functions of the Attorney General; and for connected purposes.
Income Tax Act 2013 (repealed)	AT 2 of 2013	19 February 2013
An Act to confirm temporary taxation orders; to repeal certain spent Acts and provisions of Acts about income tax; to amend the Income Tax Act 1970 and the Income Tax Act 1989; and for connected purposes.
Cash in Postal Packets Act 2013 (repealed)	AT 3 of 2013	19 February 2013
An Act to amend the Customs and Excise Management Act 1986; the Post Office Act 1993 and the Proceeds of Crime Act 2008 to make provision in relation to cash contained in postal packets; to add definitions in section 15 of the Post Office Act 1993; and for connected purposes.
Licensing (Amendment) Act 2013 (repealed)	AT 4 of 2013	19 February 2013
An Act to amend the Licensing Act 1995 in respect of the disposal of liquor seized from minors and drinking in public places.
Children and Young Persons (Amendment) Act 2013 (repealed)	AT 6 of 2013	16 April 2013
An Act to make further provision about parental responsibility for children; and for connected purposes.
Bribery Act 2013	AT 7 of 2013	21 May 2013
An Act to make provision about offences relating to bribery; and for connected purposes.
Fisheries (Amendment) Act 2013 (repealed)	AT 8 of 2013	9 July 2013
An Act to amend the Fisheries Act 2012; and for connected purposes.
Weeds (Amendment) Act 2013 (repealed)	AT 9 of 2013	9 July 2013
An Act to amend the Weeds Act 1957.
Regulation of Care Act 2013	AT 10 of 2013	15 October 2013
An Act to regulate care services and social care workers; to repeal certain Acts and provisions of certain Acts concerned with those matters; to amend the Children and Young Persons Act 2001 to provide for a Departmental fostering service; and for connected purposes.
Sunbeds Act 2013	AT 11 of 2013	15 October 2013
An Act to regulate the use of sunbeds; and for connected purposes.
Flood Risk Management Act 2013	AT 12 of 2013	15 October 2013
An Act to make provision about flood risk management and land drainage; to repeal certain Acts about those matters; to amend certain Acts about water and sewerage; and for connected purposes.
Summary Jurisdiction and Miscellanous Amendments Act 2013 (repealed)	AT 13 of 2013	19 November 2013
An Act to amend further the Summary Jurisdiction Act 1989; to make minor amendments to other enactments; and for connected purposes.

=== 2014 ===
Short title, or popular name	Citation	Royal assent
Long title
Income Tax (Amendment) Act 2014 (repealed)	AT 1 of 2014	18 February 2014
An Act to amend the law about income tax; and for connected purposes.
Public Health (Amendment) Act 2014 (repealed)	AT 2 of 2014	18 March 2014
An Act to make fresh provision about the control of disease; and for connected purposes.
Foreign Companies Act 2014	AT 3 of 2014	18 March 2014
An Act to require certain foreign companies and other bodies with legal personality to register in the Island; and for connected purposes.
Criminal Justice, Police Powers and Other Amendments Act 2014	AT 4 of 2014	20 May 2014
An Act to make new provision relating to criminal law, criminal justice and the police; to amend enactments relating to those matters; and for connected purposes.
Post Office (Amendment) Act 2014 (repealed)	AT 5 of 2014	20 May 2014
An Act to amend the powers of the Isle of Man Post Office; and for connected purposes.
Limited Liability Companies (Amendment) Act 2014 (repealed)	AT 6 of 2014	17 June 2014
An Act to amend the Limited Liability Companies Act 1996 so as to enable limited liability companies to be formed by one person and to have one member; and for connected purposes.
Copyright etc (Amendment) Act 2014	AT 7 of 2014	17 June 2014
An Act to amend the law relating to copyright, design right and rights in performances.
Representation of the People (Amendment) Act 2014 (repealed)	AT 8 of 2014	17 June 2014
An Act to amend further the Representation of the People Act 1995 with respect to the number and boundaries of the constituencies for elections to the House of Keys and their review; and for connected purposes.
Health Care Professionals Act 2014	AT 9 of 2014	15 July 2014
An Act to prescribe the manner in which certain health care professionals are required to be registered and for related purposes.
European Union (Amendment) Act 2014 (repealed)	AT 10 of 2014	15 July 2014
An Act to amend the European Communities (Isle of Man) Act 1973 consequential on the treaty concerning the accession of the Republic of Croatia to the European Union and the Protocol on the concerns of the Irish people on the Treaty of Lisbon; to enable the Council of Ministers to amend by order the list of treaties specified in the definition of ““the Treaties” or “the EU Treaties”” set out in section 1(1) of the Act; to change the Tynwald procedure for the purpose of applying EU instruments to the Island under section 2A of the Act; to make further provision in respect of orders made under section 2A of the Act which contain ambulatory references to EU instruments; and for connected purposes
Control of Employment Act 2014	AT 11 of 2014	21 October 2014
An Act to re-enact with amendments the Control of Employment Act 1975.
Cabinet Office (Legislative Amendments) Act 2014	AT 12 of 2014	21 October 2014
An Act to make amendments to enactments consequential upon renaming the Chief Secretary’s Office as the Cabinet Office.
Terrorism and Other Crime (Financial Restrictions) Act 2014	AT 13 of 2014	18 November 2014
An Act to re-enact with amendments the Terrorism (Finance) Act 2009, the Terrorist Asset-Freezing etc. Act 2010 (Isle of Man) Order 2011 and parts of the Anti-Terrorism and Crime Act 2003; to amend further the Anti-Terrorism and Crime Act 2003 and the Proceeds of Crime Act 2008; to amend other legislation in connection with bail, sexual offences and the enforcement of fines and other financial penalties; and for connected purposes.
Law Officers Act 2014 (repealed)	AT 14 of 2014	10 December 2014
An Act to make further provision about the discharge of the functions of the Attorney General; and for connected purposes.

=== 2015 ===
Short title, or popular name	Citation	Royal assent
Long title
Public Services Commission Act 2015	AT 1 of 2015	20 January 2015
An Act to establish a new body to be responsible for the employment of certain public sector employees and for connected purposes.
Sewerage (Amendment) Act 2015	AT 2 of 2015	20 January 2015
An Act to amend the Sewerage Act 1999 to make provision for the levying of a sewerage rate; and for connected purposes.
Trusts (Amendment) Act 2015 (repealed)	AT 4 of 2015	17 March 2015
An Act to amend the Trustee Act 1961 to remove the requirement for there to be two individuals or a trust corporation acting as trustees in certain circumstances; to amend the Perpetuities and Accumulations Act 1968 to remove the requirement for future dispositions to vest within a perpetuity period and to make consequential amendments to the Settled Land Act 1891; to amend the Trusts Act 1995 to widen the exclusions of foreign law concerning trusts governed by the law of the Island; and for connected purposes.
Road Traffic (Amendment) Act 2015 (repealed)	AT 6 of 2015	17 March 2015
An Act to amend the Road Traffic Act 1985 and the Building Control Act 1991; and for connected purposes.
Payment Services Act 2015	AT 7 of 2015	21 April 2015
An Act to provide for the regulation of financial institutions which are, or propose to become, payment service providers for the purposes of the Single Euro Payments Area; and for connected purposes.
Freedom of Information Act 2015	AT 8 of 2015	16 June 2015
An Act to make provision for the disclosure of information held by public authorities; and for connected purposes.
Designated Businesses (Registration and Oversight) Act 2015	AT 9 of 2015	16 June 2015
An Act to require the Isle of Man Financial Services Authority to monitor compliance on the part of certain non-financial businesses and professions with anti-money laundering and countering the financing of terrorism legislation; to make minor amendments to other enactments; and for connected purposes.
Legislation Act 2015	AT 10 of 2015	21 July 2015
An Act about general provisions for Manx legislation and non-legislative public documents; to consolidate and re-enact the Filing of Statutory Documents Act 1937, the Evidence Act 1965, the Pre-Revestment Written Laws (Ascertainment) Act 1978, the Promulgation Act 1988, the Evidence Act 1976, the Short Titles Act 1977 and the Reprints Act 1981; to repeal the Children and Young Persons Act 1969 and the Improvement of Livestock (Amendment) Act 1994; to make consequential and minor amendments to other Acts; and for connected purposes.
Interpretation Act 2015	AT 11 of 2015	21 July 2015
An Act to assist in the interpretation and shortening of the Island’s legislation and non-legislative public documents; to consolidate and re-enact the Statutory Time, et cetera, Act 1883, the Interpretation Act 1976 and the Fees and Duties Act 1989; and to make consequential and minor amendments to other Acts; and for connected purposes.
Income Tax Act 2015 (repealed)	AT 12 of 2015	21 July 2015
An Act to confirm certain temporary taxation orders and to amend the Income Tax Act 1970 and the Income Tax Act 1989.
Representation of the People (Amendment) Act 2015 (repealed)	AT 13 of 2015	21 July 2015
An Act to amend further the Representation of the People Act 1995; and for connected purposes.
Public Health (Tobacco) (Amendment) Act 2015 (repealed)	AT 14 of 2015	20 October 2015
An Act to amend the Public Health (Tobacco) Act 2006.
Audit (Amendment) Act 2015	AT 15 of 2015	15 December 2015
An Act to amend the Audit Act 2006; and for connected purposes.

=== 2016 ===
Short title, or popular name	Citation	Royal assent
Long title
Representation of the People (Amendment) Act 2016 (repealed)	AT 1 of 2016	15 March 2016
An Act to rename the Douglas West constituency; and for connected purposes.
War Memorials Act 2016	AT 2 of 2016	19 April 2016
An Act to make fresh provision about war memorials; and for connected purposes.
Criminal Procedure and Investigations Act 2016	AT 3 of 2016	19 April 2016
An Act to make provision about criminal procedure and criminal investigations.
Terrorism and Crime (Miscellaneous Amendments) Act 2016 (repealed)	AT 4 of 2016	19 April 2016
An Act to amend certain enactments so as to secure or improve compliance with international standards and obligations; and for connected purposes.
Financial Intelligence Unit Act 2016	AT 5 of 2016	19 April 2016
An Act to establish a Financial Intelligence Unit; to confer functions on it; and for connected purposes.
Consumer Protection (Amendment) Act 2016 (repealed)	AT 6 of 2016	19 April 2016
An Act to amend the Consumer Protection Act 1991 in respect of cold calling and the cancellation of certain contracts; and for connected purposes.
Marine Infrastructure Management Act 2016	AT 7 of 2016	17 May 2016
An Act to make provision for a consenting process for certain activities in the Island marine environment; and for connected purposes.
Concessionary Travel Schemes Act 2016 (repealed)	AT 8 of 2016	21 June 2016
An Act to enable the Department of Infrastructure to make concessionary travel schemes.
Preferential Payments (Amendment) Act 2016 (repealed)	AT 9 of 2016	21 June 2016
An Act to amend the Preferential Payments Act 1908 so as to provide that amounts owing by debtors in respect of certain deposits are preferential debts for the purposes of that Act; and for connected purposes.
Police (Amendment) Act 2016	AT 10 of 2016	21 June 2016
An Act to amend the Police Act 1993 and the Police Powers and Procedures Act 1998; and for connected purposes.
Road Races Act 2016	AT 11 of 2016	21 June 2016
An Act to make fresh provision about road races; and for connected purposes.
Marriage and Civil Partnership (Amendment) Act 2016	AT 12 of 2016	13 July 2016
An Act to make provision for the marriage of same sex couples, for civil partnerships of opposite sex couples, for permitting marriages according to the usages of belief organisations to be solemnized on the authority of a registrar’s certificate; and for connected purposes.
Highways (Amendment) Act 2016	AT 14 of 2016	19 July 2016
An Act to amend the Highways Act 1986 and to repeal the Highway Act, 1927.
Custody (Amendment) Act 2016	AT 15 of 2016	28 September 2016
An Act to amend the Custody Act 1995; to make provision for court security officers; to restrict the power to pass extended sentences of custody; and for connected purposes.
Local Government and Building Control (Amendment) Act 2016 (repealed)	AT 16 of 2016	17 October 2016
An Act to amend certain enactments in relation to local government, rating and building control and to provide for the introduction of fixed penalties in connection with certain statutory notices and byelaws.

=== 2017 ===
Short title, or popular name	Citation	Royal assent
Long title
Legislative Council Elections Act 2017 (repealed)	AT 1 of 2017	21 March 2017
An Act to make further provision about elections to the Legislative Council; and for connected purposes.
Treasure Act 2017	AT 2 of 2017	12 April 2017
An Act to abolish treasure trove; to make fresh provision with respect to the determination of whether found objects are treasure; and for connected purposes.
Beneficial Ownership Act 2017	AT 3 of 2017	25 April 2017
An Act to make provision about the beneficial ownership of certain legal entities; and for connected purposes.
Bills of Exchange (Amendment) Act 2017 (repealed)	AT 4 of 2017	18 July 2017
An Act to amend the Bills of Exchange Act 1883; and for connected purposes.
Equality Act 2017	AT 5 of 2017	18 July 2017
An Act to reform and harmonise equality law; to increase equality of opportunity; to make further provision about employment law; and for connected purposes.
Insurance (Amendment) Act 2017	AT 6 of 2017	18 July 2017
An Act to amend the Insurance Act 2008; and for connected purposes.
Fraud Act 2017	AT 7 of 2017	18 July 2017
An Act to make provision for, and in connection with, criminal liability for fraud and obtaining services dishonestly; and for connected purposes.
Income Tax Legislation (Amendment) Act 2017	AT 8 of 2017	18 July 2017
An Act to confirm certain temporary taxation orders; to amend various enactments relating to income tax; and for connected purposes.
Police (Detention and Bail) Act 2017 (repealed)	AT 9 of 2017	18 July 2017
An Act to make provision about the calculation of certain periods of time for the purposes of Part IV of the Police Powers and Procedures Act 1998.
Statute Law Revision Act 2017 (repealed)	AT 10 of 2017	17 October 2017
An Act to make minor amendments to the Legislation Act 2015, the Interpretation Act 2015 and other enactments; to repeal spent and redundant enactments; and for connected purposes.

=== 2018 ===
Short title, or popular name	Citation	Royal assent
Long title
Casino (Amendment) Act 2018 (repealed)	AT 1 of 2018	16 January 2018
An Act to permit the revocation of a licence in cases of non-compliance with money laundering and financing of terrorism legislation; to permit the premises in which casinos are located and the facilities and amenities provided under casino licences to be varied; to permit the Council of Ministers additional discretion in relation to deposits for concessions; and for connected matters.
Gambling (Anti-Money Laundering and Countering the Financing of Terrorism) Act 2018	AT 2 of 2018	16 January 2018
An Act to provide the necessary powers to conduct regulatory oversight of the gambling sector’s compliance with Anti-Money Laundering and Countering the Financing of Terrorism legislation; to provide sanctions for non-compliance; and for connected purposes.
Customs and Excise Act 2018 (repealed)	AT 3 of 2018	20 February 2018
An Act to provide for the application in the Island of legislation concerned with customs and excise, value added tax and import, export and trade controls; to require the maintenance of records in relation to seizures of cash and enforcement of Part VA of the Customs and Excise Management Act 1986; to amend that Act to provide for disclosure of information by the Treasury in further cases; to amend the Terrorism and Other Crime (Financial Restrictions) Act 2014 in order to allow delegation of Treasury functions in additional cases; and for connected purposes.
Dogs (Amendment) Act 2018 (repealed)	AT 4 of 2018	20 March 2018
An Act to amend the Dogs Act 1990 to impose a requirement for every dog on the Island to have implanted in it a microchip; to require the keeper of every dog on the Island to ensure that the dog is microchipped; to abolish the licensing and duty regime for dogs on the Island; and for connected purposes.
Road Transport, Licensing and Registration (Amendment) Act 2018	AT 5 of 2018	20 March 2018
An Act to amend the Road Transport Act 2001 and the Licensing and Registration of Vehicles Act 1985.
Council of Ministers (Amendment) Act 2018 (repealed)	AT 6 of 2018	20 March 2018
An Act to amend sections 2 and 4 of the Council of Ministers Act 1990 so as to provide that the Chief Minister shall be appointed by the Governor on the nomination of and from among the members of the House of Keys and that the House of Keys can pass a vote of no confidence in the Council of Ministers.
Safeguarding Act 2018	AT 7 of 2018	17 April 2018
An Act to establish a Safeguarding Board to support the safeguarding of children and vulnerable adults, and to promote such safeguarding; and for connected purposes.
Freedom of Information (Amendment) Act 2018 (repealed)	AT 8 of 2018	24 April 2018
An Act to amend the Freedom of Information Act 2015; and for connected purposes.
Credit Unions (Amendment) Act 2018 (repealed)	AT 9 of 2018	15 May 2018
An Act to amend the Credit Unions Act 1993 to impose a requirement for credit unions to be licensed by the Isle of Man Financial Services Authority; to make comprehensive and self-sufficient provision for the registration of credit unions; to break the reliance on the Industrial and Building Societies Acts 1892 to 1986; to subject credit unions to the requirements of the Financial Services Act 2008; and for connected purposes.
Data Protection Act 2018	AT 10 of 2018	15 May 2018
An Act to enable provision to be made to adequately protect personal data; to regulate the control and processing of personal data; and for connected purposes.
Anti-Money Laundering and Other Financial Crime (Miscellaneous Amendments) Act 2018 (repealed)	AT 11 of 2018	19 June 2018
An Act to amend the Anti-Terrorism and Crime Act 2003, the Proceeds of Crime Act 2008, the Terrorism and Other Crime (Financial Restrictions) Act 2014 and the Financial Intelligence Unit Act 2016, to amend certain record- keeping provisions of the Foundations Act 2011, to amend the Companies Act 1931, the Companies Act 2006, the Foundations Act 2011, the Limited Liability Companies Act 1996 and the Partnership Act 1909 in order to provide powers to make enquiries in respect of information to be registered, in accordance with recommendations specified in the Fifth Round Mutual Evaluation Report of the Committee of Experts on the Evaluation of Anti-Money Laundering Measures and the Financing of Terrorism; to amend the Criminal Justice Act 1991 to make provision for the jurisdiction of courts in the Island in relation to certain criminal offences; to amend the Gambling (Amendment) Act 2006 to add to the decisions that may be appealed under Schedule 4 to that Act and to amend the matters in respect of which there may be a stay pending an appeal; to amend Schedule 1 to the Financial Services Act 2008 in relation to the persons in respect of which an AML/CFT investigation may be conducted and Schedule 5 to the Insurance Act 2008 so as to apply certain powers available under it to such investigations; and for connected purposes.
Airports and Civil Aviation (Amendment) Act 2018 (repealed)	AT 12 of 2018	17 July 2018
An Act to amend the Airports and Civil Aviation Act 1987 to provide enabling powers for the making of Isle of Man secondary legislation that is not derived from related secondary legislation enacted in the United Kingdom; to authorise the enactment of Isle of Man secondary legislation that gives effect to international obligations of the Island in relation to civil aviation; and for \connected purposes.
Central Registry Act 2018	AT 13 of 2018	17 July 2018
An Act to establish the Central Registry; to create the office of Registrar General; to transfer certain functions of the General Registry to the Central Registry, the Registrar General and the Treasury; to make minor amendments to the law on the registration of interests in land; to provide for the Criminal Injuries Compensation Scheme; and for connected purposes.

=== 2019 ===
Short title, or popular name	Citation	Royal assent
Long title
Abortion Reform Act 2019	AT 1 of 2019	15 January 2019
An Act to restate the law relating to abortion with amendments; to make provision about access zones for premises where abortion services and related counselling are provided and for premises occupied by those providing such services and counselling; and for connected purposes.
European Union and Trade Act 2019	AT 2 of 2019	15 January 2019
An Act to repeal the European Communities (Isle of Man) Act 1973; to make provision consequent upon the withdrawal of the United Kingdom from the EU and the resultant cessation of Protocol No. 3 to the Act annexed to the Treaty relating to the Accession of the United Kingdom to the European Economic Community and to the European Atomic Energy Community signed at Brussels on the 22 January 1972; to make provision to apply EU law to, and to implement EU law in, the Island after exit day; to make provision to apply to the Island UK legislation relating to the United Kingdom’s withdrawal from the EU and the United Kingdom’s future relationship with the EU and relating to the functions of the Department of Environment, Food and Agriculture; to make provision in relation to trade and trade agreements; and for connected purposes.
Payment of Members' Expenses (Amendment) Act 2019 (repealed)	AT 3 of 2019	19 February 2019
An Act to amend the Payment of Members' Expenses Act 1989 to make provision for a member of Tynwald who is suspended from Tynwald or a Branch of Tynwald to cease to receive certain payments and expenses; and for connected purposes.
Criminal Evidence Act 2019	AT 4 of 2019	19 February 2019
An Act to make fresh provision about evidence in criminal proceedings; and for connected purposes.
Highways (Amendment) Act 2019 (repealed)	AT 5 of 2019	18 June 2019
An Act to amend the Tynwald procedure in respect of certain orders amending the definitive maps for rights of way and associated statements, to amend the definition of "planning approval" for the purposes of the Highways Act 1986; and for connected purposes.
Dormant Assets Act 2019	AT 6 of 2019	18 June 2019
An Act to provide for the establishment of a fund into which the balances of certain dormant assets may be transferred; and for the distribution of money in that fund for charitable and other purposes, subject to a right to reclaim those balances from the fund; and for connected purposes.
Charities Registration and Regulation Act 2019	AT 7 of 2019	16 July 2019
An Act to repeal and replace the Charities Registration Act 1989; to make further provision for the registration and regulation of charities; and for connected purposes.
Council of Ministers (Amendment) Act 2019 (repealed)	AT 8 of 2019	16 July 2019
An Act to uphold and support the rule of law, and the independence of the judiciary, on the Island; and for connected purposes.
Income Tax Legislation (Amendment) Act 2019 (repealed)	AT 9 of 2019	8 October 2019
An Act to confirm certain temporary taxation orders; to amend the Income Tax Act 1970; and for connected purposes.
Town and Country Planning (Amendment) Act 2019	AT 10 of 2019	8 October 2019
An Act to amend the Town and Country Planning Act 1999 to make provision for national policy directives; to clarify the matters for which provision may be made in a development procedure order; to clarify the circumstances in which an application for planning approval may be referred to the Council of Ministers; to require that any independent inspector’s report relevant to such a referral be laid before Tynwald; to provide an enabling power for a community infrastructure levy; to provide for the constitution of the planning committee; to amend section 40 of that Act; to define general importance; and for connected purposes.

=== 2020 ===
Short title, or popular name	Citation	Royal assent
Long title
Tynwald Proceedings (Amendment) Act 2020 (repealed)	AT 1 of 2020	21 January 2020
An Act to amend the Tynwald Proceedings Act 1876 to make provision about compulsion to give evidence, produce documents or supply information relating to proceedings in Tynwald and about the competence of witnesses in respect of those matters; and for connected purposes.
Public Sector Pensions (Amendment) Act 2020 (repealed)	AT 2 of 2020	17 March 2020
An Act to amend the Public Sector Pensions Act 2011 to remove the requirement to obtain consent for the making of certain schemes; to extend the definition of schemes and to provide for the amendment of existing schemes; to amend the Tynwald procedures for making orders, regulations and schemes; and for connected purposes.
Emergency Powers (Amendment) Act 2020 (repealed)	AT 3 of 2020	14 April 2020
An Act to amend the Emergency Powers Act 1936 so as to amend the procedure for emergency regulations, confer jurisdiction on courts of summary jurisdiction generally over offences under the Act, to provide for the imposition of fixed penalties, for the temporary continuation of emergency regulations at the end of a state of emergency and to make provision postponing local elections until 2021; and for connected purposes.
Registration of Business Names (Amendment) Act 2020 (repealed)	AT 4 of 2020	11 May 2020
An Act to amend the Registration of Business Names Act 1918 so as to include a company to which the Companies Act 2006 applies as a person required to be registered under the Registration of Business Names Act 1918.
Isle of Man Loans (Amendment) Act 2020 (repealed)	AT 5 of 2020	19 May 2020
An Act to amend the Isle of Man Loans Act 1974 to make provision about the borrowing powers of Government; the consolidated loans fund; borrowing authorities; and for connected purposes.
Regulation of Care (Amendment) Act 2020 (repealed)	AT 6 of 2020	26 May 2020
An Act to amend the Regulation of Care Act 2013 so as to exempt certain independent medical agencies and nurses’ agencies from the need to register under that Act; and for connected purposes.
Children and Young Persons (Amendment) Act 2020 (repealed)	AT 7 of 2020	5 June 2020
An Act to amend the Children and Young Persons Act 2001 so as to provide for reviews in respect of the deaths of children and young people; and for connected purposes.
Limitation (Childhood Abuse) Act 2020 (repealed)	AT 8 of 2020	21 July 2020
An Act to remove the limitation period for actions for damages in respect of personal injuries resulting from childhood abuse; and for connected purposes
Licensing (Amendment) Act 2020 (repealed)	AT 9 of 2020	21 July 2020
An Act to amend the Licensing Act 1995 and to amend the Music and Dancing Act 1961; and for connected purposes.
Divorce, Dissolution and Separation (Isle of Man) Act 2020	AT 10 of 2020	20 October 2020
An Act to make, in relation to marriage and civil partnership, provision about divorce, dissolution and separation; and for connected purposes.
Registration of Electors Act 2020	AT 11 of 2020	20 October 2020
An Act to restate the enactments relating to the franchise and the registration of electors; to amend the law relating to the maintenance of electoral registers; and for connected purposes.
Domestic Abuse Act 2020	AT 12 of 2020	20 October 2020
An Act to make fresh provision about domestic abuse; to make consequential and minor amendments to the Land Registration Act 1982 and for connected purposes.
Public Housing Act 2020 (repealed)	AT 13 of 2020	20 October 2020
An Act to revoke the Sale of Houses Regulations 1958 with retrospective effect; and for connected purposes.
Elections (Keys and Local Authorities) Act 2020	AT 14 of 2020	20 October 2020
An Act to repeal and replace the Representation of the People Act 1995 and the Local Elections Act 1986; to consolidate in a single enactment provisions equivalent to those made by the two aforementioned Acts; and for connected purposes.
Bank (Recovery and Resolution) Act 2020	AT 15 of 2020	17 November 2020
An Act to provide for bank recovery and resolution and for connected purposes.
Property Service Charges (Amendment) Act 2020 (repealed)	AT 16 of 2020	17 November 2020
An Act to amend the Property Service Charges Act 1989 to provide that the Act may, by order, be applied to other specified persons and dwellings; and for connected purposes.
Income Tax Act 2020 (repealed)	AT 17 of 2020	15 December 2020
An Act to confirm certain temporary taxation orders and to amend the Income Tax Act 1970 so as to enable regulations to be made which provide for debts relating to any relevant foreign tax pursuant to arrangements having effect by virtue of section 104E.
Courts, Tribunals and Local Authority Procedures, and Miscellaneous Provisions Act 2020	AT 18 of 2020	15 December 2020
An Act to enable certain societies to be registered under the Industrial and Building Societies Act 1892 as credit unions; and to make further provision with respect to societies so registered.

=== 2021 ===
Short title, or popular name	Citation	Royal assent
Long title
Gas Regulation (Amendment) Act 2021 (repealed)	AT 1 of 2021	16 February 2021
An Act to amend the Gas Regulation Act 1995 to confer the power to set parameters within which a public gas supplier may fix tariffs, and for connected purposes.
Manx Care Act 2021	AT 2 of 2021	16 March 2021
An Act to establish Manx Care; to confer duties on it in connection with the functions it discharges; and for connected purposes.
Communications Act 2021	AT 3 of 2021	20 April 2021
An Act to make fresh provision about communications, broadcasting and the Communications and Utilities Regulatory Authority; and for connected purposes.
Medicines (Amendment) Act 2021 (repealed)	AT 4 of 2021	20 April 2021
An Act to regulate the administration, sale and supply of medicinal products; and for connected purposes.
Elections and Meetings (Local Authorities) Act 2021	AT 5 of 2021	20 April 2021
An Act to change the date on which local elections in 2021 are due to take place and to enable meetings of local authorities to take place remotely; and for connected purposes.
International Maritime Standards Act 2021	AT 6 of 2021	18 May 2021
An Act to provide for the allocation of specific responsibilities for discharging the Island’s obligations under international conventions relevant to the IMO Instruments Implementation Code; to provide a mechanism by means of which the extent of the Island’s compliance with relevant international conventions may be enhanced; and for connected purposes.
Beneficial Ownership (Amendment) Act 2021 (repealed)	AT 7 of 2021	15 June 2021
An Act to amend the Beneficial Ownership Act 2017 in accordance with the recommendations of the Committee of Experts on the Evaluation of Anti-Money Laundering Measures and Financing of Terrorism and so as to separate the requirement to submit an annual statement of compliance from the requirement to submit an annual return under other specified Acts; and for connected purposes.
Council of Ministers (Amendment) Act 2021 (repealed)	AT 8 of 2021	15 June 2021
An Act to amend section 2(3)(b) of the Council of Ministers Act 1990; and for connected purposes.
Companies (Amendment) Act 2021	AT 9 of 2021	15 June 2021
An Act to amend certain companies legislation so as to enable a company incorporated under the Companies Act 2006 to re-register under the Companies Act 1931; to amend the Companies Act 1931, Companies Act 2006 and the Limited Liability Companies Act 1996 in accordance with recommendations specified in the Fifth Round Mutual Evaluation Report of the Committee of Experts on the Evaluation of Anti-Money Laundering Measures and the Financing of Terrorism; and for connected purposes.
Sexual Offences and Obscene Publications Act 2021	AT 10 of 2021	20 July 2021
An Act to make new provision about sexual offences, their prevention and the protection of children from harm from other sexual acts; to amend the Prohibition of Female Genital Mutilation Act 2010; to provide for the detention and forfeiture of land vehicles, ships and aircraft in connection with trafficking in persons; and for connected purposes.
Justice Reform Act 2021	AT 11 of 2021	20 July 2021
An Act to make new provision about the trial and sentencing of offenders and the procedures of the criminal courts, harassment and stalking and juries and their verdicts; to place the Criminal Justice Board on a statutory footing; to make fresh provision about judicial retirement; to enable sentencing guidelines to be adopted; to authorise rules of court to enable or require delivery and authentication of information in or in connection with court proceedings by electronic means; to authorise the use of live video and audio links in summary court proceedings and in other proceedings before the High Bailiff; to make minor amendments to legislation; and for connected purposes.
International Co-operation (Protection from Liability) Act 2021	AT 12 of 2021	20 July 2021
An Act to make provision for protection from liability against claims for damages, costs and consequential loss in cases where a public authority provides assistance pursuant to a request made by a relevant authority of a country or territory outside the Island, and for connected purposes.
Human Tissue and Organ Donation Act 2021	AT 13 of 2021	20 July 2021
An Act to make provision about activities involving human tissue and the donation of human organs; and for connected purposes.
Sky Lanterns and Balloons (Prohibition) Act 2021	AT 14 of 2021	20 July 2021
An Act to prohibit the sale, supply and release into the atmosphere of sky lanterns, to prohibit the release into the atmosphere of helium balloons, to provide for exemptions from such prohibitions; and for connected purposes.
Statute Law Revision Act 2021 (repealed)	AT 15 of 2021	20 July 2021
An Act to repeal spent enactments, and make minor amendments and corrections to Manx enactments; and for connected purposes.
Road Traffic Legislation (Amendment) Act 2021	AT 16 of 2021	18 October 2021
An Act to amend the Road Traffic Act 1985, the Road Traffic Regulation Act 1985 and the Local Government (Miscellaneous Provisions) Act 1984
Adoption Act 2021	AT 17 of 2021	18 October 2021
An Act to modernise the law relating to adoption; and for connected purposes.
Competition Act 2021	AT 18 of 2021	18 October 2021
An Act to make provision about competition and the abuse of a dominant position in the market; to empower the Isle of Man Office of Fair Trading to collaborate with competition authorities in other jurisdictions to address issues and behaviour in those other jurisdictions that affect the Island; to permit the Isle of Man Office of Fair Trading to carry out with regulators concurrent investigations into Isle of Man regulated markets; to repeal and replace Part 2 of the Fair Trading Act 1996; to make provision for mergers; and for connected purposes.
Housing (Miscellaneous Provisions)(Amendment) Act 2021	AT 19 of 2021	18 October 2021
An Act to making further provision in relation to leasehold premises; to permit qualifying tenants to form a company through which to apply for a management order in respect of the premises of which they are tenants; to permit qualifying tenants of premises to apply for a management order in respect of the premises without regard to whether or not the management responsibilities are being satisfactorily discharged; and for connected purposes.
Climate Change Act 2021	AT 20 of 2021	14 December 2021
An Act to set a target year of 2050 and to make provision for the setting of interim targets for the reduction of greenhouse gas emissions; to make provision about the mitigation of climate change and the enhancement of natural carbon storage; to impose climate change duties on public bodies; to make provision for energy generation and energy use and for the reduction and recycling of waste; and for connected purposes.
Enterprise (Aviation and Merchant Shipping)(Miscellaneous Amendments) Act 2021 (repealed)	AT 21 of 2021	14 December 2021
An Act to amend the Airports and Civil Aviation Act 1987 to amend the powers to make regulations and orders under that Act; amend the enforcement and discretionary powers under that Act; amend the Merchant Shipping (Miscellaneous Provisions) Act 1996 to permit the exemption, discount or deferral of fees payable under that Act; and repeal the Merchant Shipping (Load Lines) Act 1981; and connected purposes.
Administration of Justice and Other Amendments Act 2021	AT 22 of 2021	14 December 2021
An Act to amend the Administration of Justice Act 1981 to make provision for the keeping of a register of judgments and debts enforceable by a warrant for payment; to make certain other amendments relating to the disclosure of information for the purposes of the register of judgments and the enforcement of executions; to amend the Summary Jurisdiction Act 1989 in respect of the register of sums adjudged to be paid on conviction; and for connected purposes.
Landlord Registration (Private Housing) Act 2021	AT 23 of 2021	14 December 2021
An Act to provide for the registration of landlords and landlords’ representatives of private rented dwellings; for the application and enforcement of standards for landlords, landlords’ representatives and private rented dwellings; for the regulation and protection of occupancy deposits; for the monitoring of the private rented sector; and for connected purposes.
Liquor Licensing and Public Entertainments Act 2021	AT 24 of 2021	14 December 2021
An Act to repeal and re-enact, with amendments, the Licensing Act 1995, make provision for the regulation and supply of liquor and for the regulation of public entertainments; and for connected purposes.

=== 2022 ===
Short title, or popular name	Citation	Royal assent
Long title
Manx Care (Amendment) Act 2022 (repealed)	AT 1 of 2022	21 June 2022
An Act to amend the Manx Care Act 2021 so as to enable the Department of Health and Social Care to make updated provision in respect of complaints in respect of services provided and functions performed under the National Health Service Act 2001, the Social Services Act 2011 and the Children and Young Persons Act 2001.
Income Tax Act 2022 (repealed)	AT 2 of 2022	19 July 2022
An Act to confirm the Income Tax (Substance Requirements) Order 2021; to amend the Income Tax Act 1970; and for connected purposes.

=== 2023 ===
Short title, or popular name	Citation	Royal assent
Long title
Capacity Act 2023	AT 1 of 2023	25 April 2023
An Act to make provision relating to the property, financial affairs and health and welfare of persons who lack capacity and for establishing the principles to be applied for such purposes, for lasting powers of attorney, and for connected purposes.
Energy Act 2023 (repealed)	AT 2 of 2023	25 April 2023
An Act to amend the Energy Act 1980; to amend the Gas Regulation Act 1995; and for connected purposes.
Trusts and Trustees Act 2023 (repealed)	AT 3 of 2023	18 July 2023
An Act to amend the Trustee Act 2001 in respect of trustees’ duties, powers and liabilities, to amend the Trustee Act 1961 in respect of trustees’ powers and the powers of the court, to amend the Limitation Act 1984 in respect of actions against trust property and to amend the Apportionment Act 1982 in respect of entitlement to income arising under a trust; and for connected purposes.
Income Tax Act 2023 (repealed)	AT 4 of 2023	12 December 2023
An Act to confirm the Income Tax (Substance Requirements and Related Provisions) Order 2023.
Animal Welfare Act 2023	AT 5 of 2023	12 December 2023
An Act to make provision relating to animal welfare and to empower the Department of Environment, Food and Agriculture to apply legislation of the United Kingdom relating to the welfare of animals to the Island; and for connected purposes.

=== 2024 ===
Short title, or popular name	Citation	Royal assent
Long title
Gas Regulation (Amendment) Act 2024 (repealed)	AT 1 of 2024	16 January 2024
An Act to amend section 12 of the Gas Regulation Act 1995 to confer power on the Communications and Utilities Regulatory Authority to require persons to produce documents and furnish information to it for the purposes of the setting of parameters within which a public gas supplier may fix tariffs (and to make consequential amendments); to amend Schedule 2 to that Act to confer on the Council of Ministers the power to make orders to specify circumstances where non-payment by a tariff customer may not lead to the cutting off of the supply of gas to premises; and for connected purposes.
Sanctions Act 2024	AT 2 of 2024	16 April 2024
An Act to provide for the implementation in the Island of United Kingdom sanctions provisions; to amend the Terrorism and Other Crime (Financial Restrictions) Act 2014 so as to align certain provisions more closely with equivalent provisions of United Kingdom law; and for connected purposes.
Income Tax Act 2024 (repealed)	AT 3 of 2024	16 April 2024
An Act to confirm the Income Tax (Personal Allowance) (Temporary Taxation) Order 2023; to amend the Income Tax Act 1970; and for connected purposes.
Vaping Products Act 2024	AT 4 of 2024	21 May 2024
An Act to make provision in respect of the manufacture of vaping products, the composition of vaping liquids and the sale, importation, advertising and promotion of such products; and for connected purposes.
Employment (Amendment) Act 2024 (repealed)	AT 5 of 2024	15 October 2024
An Act to amend the Employment Act 2006 to make further provision for family leave rights and whistleblowing; and for connected purposes.
Fines and Penalties Act 2024	AT 6 of 2024	15 October 2024
An Act to modernise references in Acts of Tynwald to fines and penalties imposed on summary conviction and to amend certain provisions relating to daily fines or penalties in such legislation; and for connected purposes.

=== 2025 ===
Short title, or popular name	Citation	Royal assent
Long title
Public Sector Payments Act 2025	AT 1 of 2025	18 February 2025
An Act to enable payments to holders of certain posts or positions and members of certain bodies, and for connected purposes.
Charities Registration and Regulation (Amendment) Act 2025 (repealed)	AT 2 of 2025	22 April 2025
An Act to amend the Charities Registration and Regulation Act 2019 to provide for the delegation of the regulatory functions of the Attorney General in connection with charities.
Town and Country Planning (Amendment) Act 2025	AT 3 of 2025	17 June 2025
An Act to amend the Town and Country Planning Act 1999 by expanding the definition of “development” for the purposes of that Act, to provide for a system of prior approvals following the grant of planning approval and to provide for the imposition of fees and charges; and for connected purposes.
Income Tax Act 2025	AT 4 of 2025	17 June 2025
An Act to confirm the Income Tax (Miscellaneous Amendments) (Temporary Taxation) Order 2024; to amend the Income Tax Act 1970; and for connected purposes.
Treasury (Miscellaneous Provisions) Act 2025	AT 5 of 2025	8 July 2025
An Act to amend various Acts relating to finance, and auditing and inspection of accounts; to make provision for the calling in by the Treasury of notes and coins in circulation; to amend the Fire Service Act 1984 in respect of the imposition of charges; to amend the Interpretation Act 2015 in connection with the prescribing of fees in any enactment; and for connected purposes.
Reproductive Rights Act 2025	AT 6 of 2025	21 October 2025
An Act to make certain new provision in relation to fertilisation, embryology and surrogacy; to make new provision about the persons who in certain circumstances are to be treated as the parents of a child; to amend the Civil Registration Act 1984 consequentially in relation to registering births; and for connected purposes.
Statute Law Revision Act 2025	AT 7 of 2025	21 October 2025
An Act to make minor, clerical, and substantive amendments to certain enactments.
Global Minimum Tax (Pillar Two) Order 2024 (Confirmation) Act 2025	AT 8 of 2025	21 October 2025
An Act to confirm the Global Minimum Tax (Pillar Two) Order 2024.
