= General Parke =

General Parke may refer to:

- John Parke (1827–1900), Union Army major general
- Thomas Parke (Royal Marines officer) (1780–1858), Royal Marines general
- William Parke (British Army officer) (1822–1897), British Army general

== See also ==
- Cecil Park (British Army officer) (1885–1913), British Army major general
- Floyd Lavinius Parks (1896–1959), U.S. Army lieutenant general
- Garry L. Parks (born 1947), U.S. Marine Corps lieutenant general
