= John Wood (Isle of Man governor) =

Captain John Wood

Governor of the Isle of Man
- In office 1761–1777
- Preceded by: Basil Cochrane (1751–1761)
- Succeeded by: Edward Smith (1777–1793)

Personal details
- Born: 1722
- Died: 30 April 1777 (aged 54–55)

John Wood (1722 – 30 April 1777) was a military officer in the British Army and Governor of the Isle of Man from 1761 until his death in 1777.

Wood was born in 1722 at Carse near Dumfries in Scotland. He was a captain in the British Army before he began his political career.

He was appointed as Captain-in-Chief and later Governor of the Isle of Man by James Murray, 2nd Duke of Atholl in 1761. Later in 1765, he appointed Governor of the Isle of Man by King George III. He was the first governor to be appointed directly by the British monarch, rather than by the Earl of Derby or the Duke of Atholl. Lieutenant Governor Henry Hope acted as his deputy.

There is a memorial plaque to Captain Wood in St Mary's Church, Castletown.
