= Portrait of Cornelius Smelt =

1826 painting by Thomas Barber

Cornelius Smelt
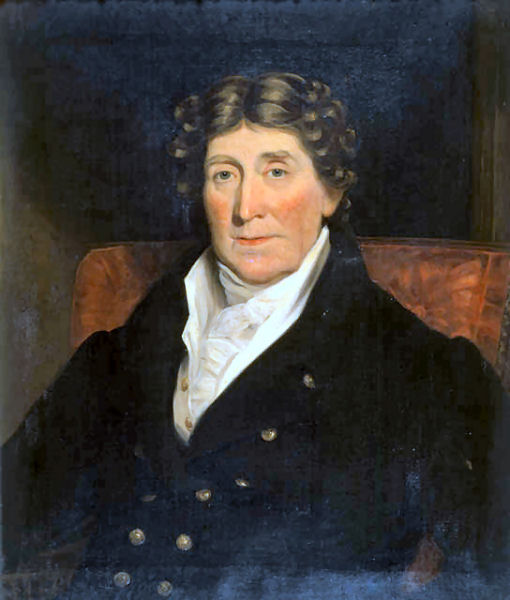
- Artist: Thomas Barber
- Year: 1826
- Medium: Oil on canvas
- Location: Manx Museum; Douglas, Isle of Man

The Smelt Portrait is an 1826 painting in oils of the Lieutenant Governor of the Isle of Man, Cornelius Smelt, by Thomas Barber (1771–1843). It was commissioned whilst Governor Smelt was at the height of his popularity.

== History ==
A meeting, chaired by Colonel Mark Wilks, was held at the George Hotel, Castletown, Isle of Man, on August 10, 1826, at which it was decided to commission a portrait of Governor Smelt to be hung in the House of Keys.

Smelt's governorship is remembered as one in which he displayed great moral courage in difficult circumstances notably his wisdom and fortitude in the long period when the House of Keys and the Duke of Atholl fought their historic political battles.

A subscription was opened which raised £52, and the renowned portrait artist Thomas Barber was commissioned. Governor Smelt, however, did not desire that his memory be "transmitted to posterity in this way," and in a letter to Colonel Wilks he declined the honour of having the portrait placed in the Keys Chamber.

Consequently, Capt. Cesar Bacon, husband of Smelt's daughter, bought the painting where it was hung at his newly built home, Seafield, in the parish of Santon.

The portrait remained the property of Capt. Bacon's descendants until it was presented to the Manx Museum in 1925.

- Following Governor Smelt's death in 1832 the Smelt Monument was erected in Castletown in his memory.
- Until its refurbishment in 2018, a copy of the Smelt portrait could be seen in the George Hotel, Castletown, Isle of Man.

== See also ==
- Cornelius Smelt
- Smelt Monument

== Sources ==
Bibliography

- D. Winterbottom Governors of the Isle of Man since 1765 Douglas: Manx National Heritage 1999 (ISBN 09524019-5-9)
