= Richard Dawson (British Army officer) =

British Army officer

Lieutenant-General Richard Dawson

2nd Lieutenant Governor of the Isle of Man
- In office 1775–1790
- Monarch: George III
- Preceded by: Henry Hope
- Succeeded by: Alexander Shaw

Personal details
- Born: Richard Dawson
- Died: 1800

Military service
- Allegiance: Kingdom of Great Britain
- Branch/service: British Army
- Rank: Lieutenant-General

Richard Dawson (died c. 1800) was a soldier and administrator who served as the second Lieutenant Governor of the Isle of Man.

== Career ==
Dawson served in the Royal Engineers reaching the rank of major in 1772. From 1775, Dawson acted as Lieutenant Governor and deputy to the Governor of the Isle of Man. Promoted to colonel in 1783, he retired to Canterbury in Kent in 1790. He was given the rank of major general in 1793 and lieutenant general in 1798, but died two years later.

His wife died following a house fire in 1804.

Government offices
Preceded by Henry Hope	Lieutenant Governor of the Isle of Man; 1775–1790	Succeeded by Alexander Shaw
