= Henry Hope (Isle of Man lieutenant governor) =

1st Lieutenant Governor of the Isle of Man
- In office 1773–1775
- Monarch: George III
- Preceded by: New Post
- Succeeded by: Richard Dawson

Henry Hope was an administrator who served as the first Lieutenant Governor of the Isle of Man.

== Career ==
From 1773 Hope acted as Lieutenant Governor and Deputy to the Governor of the Isle of Man. He retired from the post in 1775.

Government offices
Preceded by New Post	Lieutenant Governor of the Isle of Man; 1773–1775	Succeeded by Richard Dawson
