= Ian McFadyen (disambiguation) =

Ian McFadyen may refer to:

- Ian McFadyen (born 1948), Australian television producer and actor
- Ian McFadyen (footballer) (1909-1991), Scottish footballer, see List of Bury F.C. players (1–24 appearances)

== See also ==
- Ian Macfadyen (born 1942), Royal Air Force air marshal
