= Amelia Murray =

Amelia Murray may refer to:

- Amelia Jane Murray (1800–1896), Scottish artist
- Amelia Matilda Murray (1795–1885), British botanist and writer
- Amelia Murray (born 1993), New Zealand singer, songwriter and multi-instrumentalist known professionally as Fazerdaze
- Amelia Murray (born 1997), bassist for Spacey Jane from 2016 to 2019
