= Richard Posnett =

British colonial administrator (1919-2009)

Sir Richard Posnett KBE CMG

Governor of Belize (Note: Known as British Honduras until 1 June 1973.)
- In office 1972–1976
- Monarch: Elizabeth II
- Premier: George Cadle Price
- Preceded by: Sir John Paul
- Succeeded by: Peter McEntee

Governor of Bermuda
- In office 1981–1983
- Monarch: Elizabeth II
- Premier: Sir David Gibbons; John Swan
- Preceded by: Sir Peter Ramsbotham
- Succeeded by: Mark Herdman (acting)

Personal details
- Born: 19 July 1919 Kotagiri, India
- Died: 11 May 2009 (aged 89)
- Education: St John's College, Cambridge

Sir Richard Neil Posnett KBE CMG (19 July 1919 – 11 May 2009) was a British colonial administrator who served as Governor of Belize (from 1972 to 1976) and Governor of Bermuda (from 1981 to 1983). He was also briefly Commissioner of Anguilla (in 1969) and High Commissioner of the United Kingdom to Uganda (in 1979).

Posnett was educated at Kingswood School, Bath, and St John's College, Cambridge, where he won the 120 yards hurdles for Cambridge versus Oxford in 1940. He was a founder of the Uganda Olympic Committee and a fluent speaker of Swahili.

== Notes ==
Government offices
Preceded by Sir John Paul	Governor of Belize; 1972–1976	Succeeded by Peter McEntee
Preceded by Sir Peter Ramsbotham	Governor of Bermuda; 1981–1983	Succeeded by Mark Herdman (acting)
