= Ronald Garvey =

British Colonial Service administrator (1903–1991)

Sir Ronald Garvey KCMG KCVO MBE

14th Administrator of Saint Vincent
- In office 1944–1948
- Monarch: George VI
- Preceded by: Sir Alexander Elder Beattie
- Succeeded by: Sir Walter Coutts

14th Governor of British Honduras
- In office 28 February 1949 – 1952
- Monarch: George VI
- Preceded by: Sir Edward Hawkesworth
- Succeeded by: Sir Patrick Renison

17th High Commissioner for the Western Pacific
- In office 6 October 1952 – 31 December 1952
- Monarch: Elizabeth II
- Preceded by: Sir Brian Freeston
- Succeeded by: Sir Kenneth Maddocks

19th Governor of Fiji
- In office 6 October 1952 – 20 October 1958
- Monarch: Elizabeth II
- Preceded by: Sir Brian Freeston
- Succeeded by: Sir Kenneth Maddocks

20th Lieutenant Governor of the Isle of Man
- In office 1959–1966
- Monarch: Elizabeth II
- Preceded by: Sir Ambrose Dundas
- Succeeded by: Sir Peter Stallard

Personal details
- Born: 4 July 1903 Lincolnshire, United Kingdom
- Died: 31 May 1991 (aged 87)
- Citizenship: British
- Spouse: Patricia Dorothy McGusty
- Children: 3 daughters, 1 son
- Education: University of Cambridge
- Occupation: Colonial administrator

Sir Ronald Herbert Garvey KCMG KCVO MBE (4 July 1903 – 31 May 1991) was a British Colonial Service administrator who served in the Pacific, the West Indies, and as Lieutenant Governor of the Isle of Man at the end of his career.

== Biography ==
=== Education and early career ===
A parson's son from the Lincolnshire Wolds, Garvey was admitted on a choral scholarship to Trent College (Long Eaton) where he studied from 1916 to 1923. He then entered Emmanuel College at the University of Cambridge, where he read history and graduated B.A. in anthropology, while preparing to take the civil service examination, hoping to join the Indian Civil Service. He became involved in breaking the 1926 general strike, and did not find time to study for this examination, and instead applied for a position in the Colonial Service. He accepted a position in the Solomon Islands Protectorate, and sailed from Southampton to Fiji in November 1926.

Garvey spent six years in the Solomons, most of them as a district officer for the Santa Cruz Group, on Vanikoro, more than 500 miles away from the colony's headquarters at Tulagi. Amidst other occupations, he searched for archeological evidence of the French explorer Lapérouse's presence on the island. In July 1932, he accepted an appointment as Assistant Secretary at the Western Pacific High Commission in Suva, Fiji, where he married in October 1934 the daughter of a local doctor (see below). In 1938–1939, he served as acting Resident Commissioner of the Gilbert and Ellice Islands colony, a senior position not usually offered to people in their thirties. He returned to his former position in Suva, but was sent to Tonga in late August 1939 to persuade Queen Salote to declare war on Nazi Germany if war was to break out in Europe. Due to his success, a few months later he was appointed a member of the Order of the British Empire (MBE).

In Spring 1940, while on his way back to Britain on leave, he was recalled to serve as acting Resident Commissioner in the New Hebrides, at a time of turmoil as this Franco-British territory was the first to follow Charles de Gaulle's appeal to fight against Philippe Pétain's government. Garvey assisted the French Commissioner Henri Sautot in his quick and bloodless overthrowing of Vichy power in New Caledonia. In October 1941, he was again sent to the Gilbert and Ellice colony to put phosphate-rich Ocean Island "on a war-time footing" as its "Supreme Co-Ordinating Authority", until Japan's advance led to the island's evacuation in March 1942.

Garvey then left Fiji for a new position in East African Nyasaland, but did not arrive until October before of the difficulty of travelling due to war-time restrictions. He found it hard to adjust to this African setting after 16 years in the Pacific, but was soon offered the position of Administrator of Saint Vincent, in the West Indies. The Garvey family left Nyasaland for England in February 1944, Ronald sailing for St. Vincent in September.

=== Governor ===
Garvey started work as Administrator of Saint Vincent in 1944. He moved on to be Governor of British Honduras in 1949; there he had to contend with a general strike and the need to devalue the local currency. He launched one of the first credit unions in British Honduras to protect poorer people from loan sharks. He then served as Governor of Fiji from 1952, where he demonstrated his considerable public relations skills, until his retirement in 1958.

In retirement he became Lieutenant Governor of the Isle of Man: he launched major initiatives there in the early 1960s to increase tourism, including the establishment of a new casino, and promoted the local tax incentives. He also sent the Home Office a Manx cat to replace the one they had lost. He subsequently wrote a memoir entitled Gentleman Pauper published in 1984. He is buried in Wrentham cemetery in Suffolk.

=== Family ===
Garvey married Patricia Dorothy McGusty (1913-2005), daughter of Dr. V.W.T. McGusty, a District Medical Officer in Fiji, on 30 October 1934; they had one son, Anthony (born 1935), and three daughters (Grania, Lavinia and Julia)

== Bibliography ==
- Sir Ronald Garvey, Gentleman Pauper, Bognor Regis: Anchor Publications, 1984.

Government offices
Preceded by Alexander Beattie	Administrator of Saint Vincent; 1944–1948	Succeeded by Walter Coutts
Preceded by Edward Hawkesworth	Governor of British Honduras; 1949–1952	Succeeded by Patrick Renison
Preceded by Sir Brian Freeston	Governor of Fiji; 1952–1958	Succeeded by Sir Kenneth Maddocks
Preceded by Sir Ambrose Dundas	Lieutenant Governor of the Isle of Man; 1959–1966	Succeeded by Sir Peter Stallard
