= Cecil Park =

Cecil Park may refer to:

- Cecil Park, New South Wales, a suburb of Sydney
- Cecil Park (British Army officer) (1885–1913)
