= Smelt Monument =

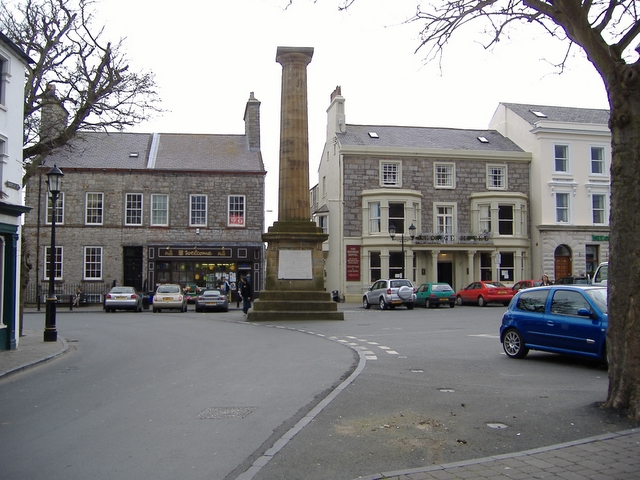
- Smelt Monument
- Interactive map of Smelt Monument
- Location: Castletown, Isle of Man
- Coordinates: 54°04′25.57″N 04°39′10.44″W
- Designer: John Welch
- Type: Commemorative column
- Beginning date: 1836
- Completion date: 1837
- Opening date: 1837; 189 years ago
- Dedicated to: Cornelius Smelt

The Smelt Monument is a monument in Castletown, Isle of Man built to commemorate the life of Cornelius Smelt, the first royally appointed Lieutenant Governor of the Isle of Man, who died in 1832. Work on the monument began in 1836, and ceased the following year. It was built to a design by John Welch at a cost of £180. It is a column of the Grecian Doric Order built from locally sourced stone, the work being undertaken by John Thomas. It was listed as a Registered Building of the Isle of Man in 1984.

== History ==
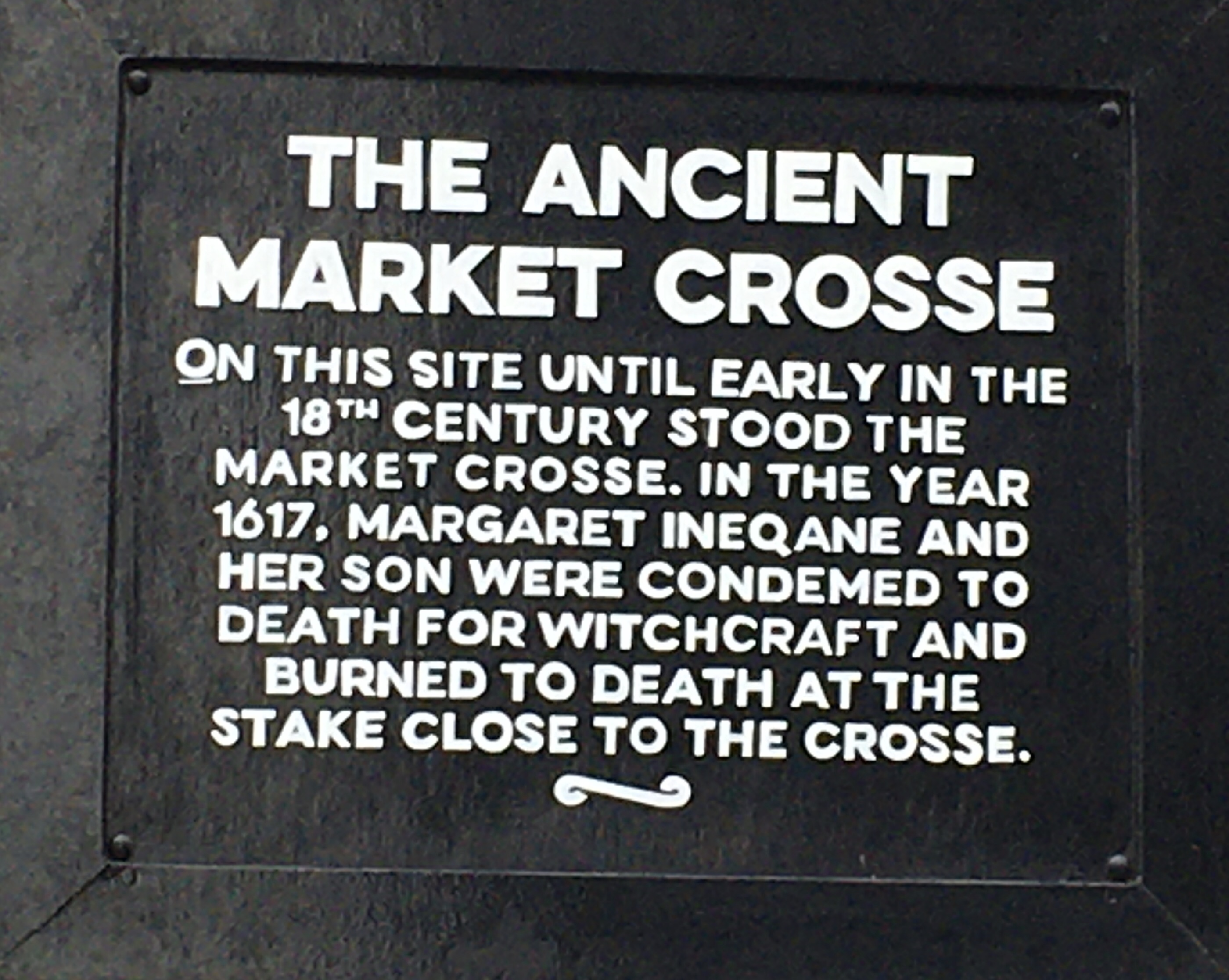
Site of ancient market cross Castletown, the scene of the death of Margaret Inequane and her son, who were burned at the stake having been found guilty of witchcraft.

The Smelt Monument was erected on a site which was formerly occupied by an ancient market cross. It was on this site in 1617 that Margaret Inequane and her son were burned at the stake having been found guilty of witchcraft.

After the death of Cornelius Smelt in 1832, Sir William Hillary, a friend of Smelt's, proposed that a memorial be built in his honour. A meeting was called at the Seneschal's Office, Seneschal Lane, Douglas, on 18 August 1835, where it was decided that a column should be erected, financed partly from funds then being held in Holmes' Bank and intended for a portrait of Smelt. A further £200 was raised, and John Welch, an architect, drew up two designs, one for an obelisk, and the other a Grecian Doric. Following deliberation the Grecian Doric design was decided upon, and the contract was awarded to John Thomas, the consideration being £180.

At a further meeting at the George Inn in Castletown it was resolved to site the monument at the intersection of the College and Castletown Roads, near Hango Hill, and space was set aside for the construction. However this met with a strong objection from Deemster John Christian. Deemster Christian suggested the monument be sited either in front of King William's College or on The Parade. It was subsequently decided to site the monument on The Parade, Castletown, facing Castle Rushen. Welch was well known to Sir William Hillary being responsible for the design of the Tower of Refuge, and the architect's services were requisitioned for the Smelt Memorial Scheme. A request was made to Welch by the committee to:

"furnish estimates for two columns not exceeding £200 each, the one of a Grecian Doric column, the other an obelisk."

It was fully intended that there was to be an official first stone laying, to be undertaken by Sir William. But there was such a delay in arranging this that the contractor had to start work, and by the end of October 1836, the masons had a portion of the column built. No formal stone laying ceremony was carried out. The work was completed in early January 1837.

=== Statue ===
Various rumours persist regarding the placing of a statue of Cornelius Smelt on top of the monument; a particular one suggests that funds had been exhausted and there was no money available for a statue. Therefore the following letter from Sir William Hillary to John McHutchin, the Clerk of the Rolls on the subject of a surmounting statue is of particular interest.

"My Dear Sir,

It has afforded me much pleasure to hear that the Monument is now so advanced that its effect can be seen and understood by everyone, and that it meets with almost general approbation. We must, however, feel that something is still wanting to render the work complete. You are aware that it was first proposed to place an urn which would have cost at least £10 on the summit, which no doubt would have a good effect, but not in any respect equal to a statue of our late friend, nor so calculated to hand down his memory in the most gratifying manner to future generations. I have therefore been most anxious this should, if possible, be accomplished, and have caused enquiries to be made in England by Mr Welch, as to the terms on which a statue rather larger than life, cut in hard and durable stone by an able artist, could be procured.

The result of these enquiries has been that about £40 would be requisite, for which it might be executed in a manner worthy of the Monument on which it is proposed to be placed. I hope there is a feeling amongst many of the friends of the deceased to add this testimony of their respect to his memory, and that by a separate subscription sufficient funds may without difficulty be obtained. If you approve this measure, will you have the kindness to consult the gentlemen of your neighbourhood as the most prompt steps to be taken that the whole work be finished without delay.

I have understood Mr Gawne has expressed his readiness to contribute very liberally, but you will be the best judge as to the mode of proceeding. Not any scale can be fixed, but I am ready to put down my name for any sum from £1 to £5 which you and any other friend of the late Governor Smelt may be willing to contribute. If the plan is approved our High Bailiff will, I doubt not, render me his aid in procuring subscriptions here.

It is particularly to be desired that we should obtain a profile likeness of the late Governor, by the aid of which, and the portrait in the possession of Captain Bacon, an experienced artist would be able to procure a likeness sufficiently striking for so elevated a situation. Will you have the goodness to enquire if such a profile or other likeness exists in Castletown?

I have suggested that the figure should be calculated a simple but bold effect - perhaps having a Military Cloak thrown loosely over his other dress - one hand resting on the Sword of State, the other to hold a scroll of paper, as denoting his civil functions. His thinly scattered hair to show his fine open forehead, as seen before he wore a wig in his later days.

I believe it would accord better with the size of the Column that the Statute should not much exceed the natural height, perhaps about 7 feet high would be sufficient. We must rely upon you for a correct translation into the Manx language of the inscription to be placed on the pedestal which, with the Arms of the Island and the Smelt family, will be amongst the last parts of the work executed.

I should be happy further to confer with you on the subject when you next visit Douglas, and beg you to believe me."

— Sir William Hillary, Fort Anne, Douglas. December 17th, 1836.

Sir William Hillary did not receive sufficient support for his scheme to erect a statue. The reference in his letter to a "portrait in the possession of Capt. Bacon;" concerns the Smelt Portrait, a painting of Cornelius Smelt by Thomas Barber.

In addition to the Smelt Monument, John Welch designed numerous buildings on the Isle of Man; two of the most prominent being the Tower of Refuge and King William's College.

== See also ==
- Cornelius Smelt
- Smelt portrait
