= Henry Murray (British politician) =

Lord Henry Murray

4th Lieutenant Governor of the Isle of Man
- In office 1804–1805
- Monarch: George III
- Preceded by: Alexander Shaw
- Succeeded by: Cornelius Smelt

Personal details
- Born: Henry Murray; 13 June 1767
- Died: 3 December 1805 (aged 38)
- Spouse: Eliza Kent

Military service
- Allegiance: United Kingdom
- Branch/service: British Army
- Rank: Colonel
- Battles/wars: Irish Rebellion of 1798

Lord Henry Murray (13 June 1767 – 3 December 1805) was a soldier and administrator who served as the fourth Lieutenant Governor of the Isle of Man.

== Career ==
Born the fourth son of John Murray, 3rd Duke of Atholl, Henry Murray was appointed Colonel of the newly formed Royal Manx Fencibles in September 1795. The following year saw the regiment being deployed to Derry in anticipation of the Irish Rebellion of 1798 and in June 1798 he ordered the burning of Ballymoney in reprisal for the rebellion. In February 1802 he went to Bath to recover from a bout of gout and later that year, following the Peace of Amiens, his regiment was disbanded at Whitehaven. Murray acted from 1804 as Lieutenant Governor and Deputy to his brother, John Murray, 4th Duke of Atholl, in his role as Governor of the Isle of Man. Murray died in office only a year later in 1805: there is a memorial to him at Old Kirk Braddan.

== Family ==
In 1786 he married Eliza Kent; they had one son and five daughters. There is a memorial to his son, Lieutenant-Colonel The Hon. Richard Murray, Coldstream Guards (1787-1843), in Old Kirk Braddan.

His daughter Amelia (Emily) Jane Murray married General Sir John Oswald.

Government offices
Preceded by Alexander Shaw	Lieutenant Governor of the Isle of Man; 1804–1805	Succeeded by Cornelius Smelt
