= Alexander Shaw (British Army officer) =

Colonel Alexander Shaw

3rd Lieutenant Governor of the Isle of Man
- In office 1790–1804
- Monarch: George III
- Preceded by: Richard Dawson
- Succeeded by: Henry Murray

Personal details
- Born: Alexander Shaw; 1737
- Died: 30 May 1811 (aged 73–74)
- Spouse(s): Charlotte Stewart; Anne Elizabeth Blanckley

Military service
- Allegiance: United Kingdom
- Branch/service: British Army
- Rank: Colonel
- Battles/wars: Seven Years' War; American Revolutionary War

Alexander Shaw (1737 – 30 May 1811) was a soldier and administrator who served as the third Lieutenant Governor of the Isle of Man.

== Career ==
Shaw was commissioned into the 60th Regiment of Foot in 1756. He served in North America during the Seven Years' War as aide-de-camp to General Augustine Prevost and was severely wounded at the capture of Quebec in 1759. Shaw rose to the rank of colonel and returned to his home at Tordarroch House near Pitlochry at the end of the American Revolutionary War in 1783. From 1790 he acted as Lieutenant Governor and Deputy to the Governor of the Isle of Man: Shaw retired in 1804. He was the 15th Chief of Clan Shaw and 10th Chief of Clan Shaw of Tordarroch.

== Family ==
He married firstly Charlotte Stewart; they had two sons. He married secondly Ann Elizabeth Blanckley; they had four sons and four daughters.

Government offices
Preceded by Richard Dawson	Lieutenant Governor of the Isle of Man; 1790–1804	Succeeded by Henry Murray
