= George Somerset, 3rd Baron Raglan =

British soldier and Conservative politician (1857–1921)

The Right Honourable The Lord Raglan GBE CB
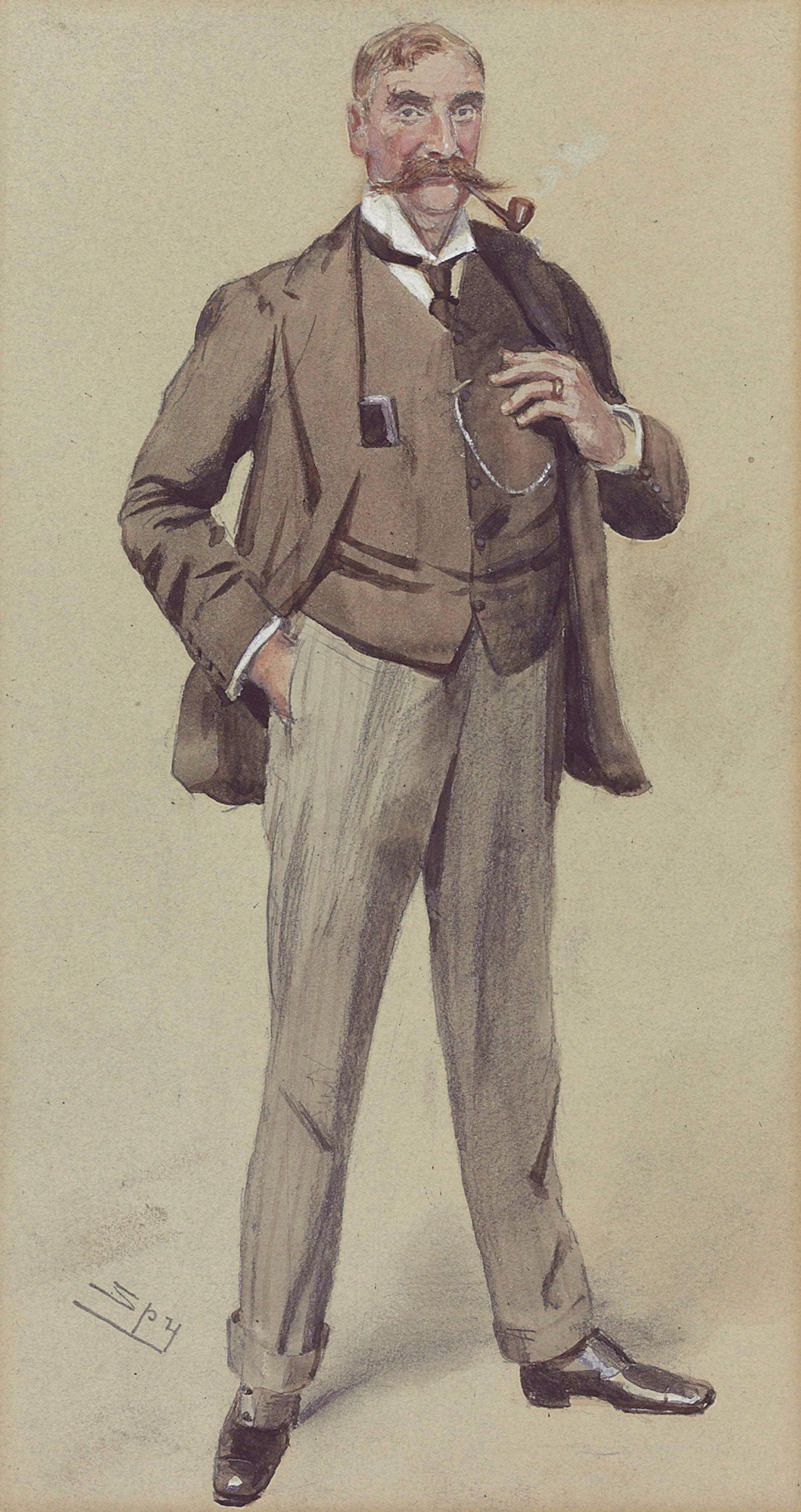

Lieutenant Governor of the Isle of Man
- In office 1902–1919
- Monarchs: Edward VII, George V
- Preceded by: The Lord Henniker
- Succeeded by: Sir William Fry

Under-Secretary of State for War
- In office 13 November 1900 – 8 August 1902
- Monarchs: Victoria, Edward VII
- Prime Minister: The Marquess of Salisbury
- Preceded by: George Wyndham
- Succeeded by: The Earl of Hardwicke

Personal details
- Born: 18 September 1857
- Died: 24 October 1921 (aged 64)
- Spouse: Ethel Jemima Ponsonby (m. 1883)
- Children: 6

Military service
- Allegiance: United Kingdom
- Branch/service: British Army
- Years of service: 1870–c.1880
- Rank: Captain
- Battles/wars: Second Anglo-Afghan War

George FitzRoy Henry Somerset, 3rd Baron Raglan (18 September 1857 – 24 October 1921), styled The Honourable George Somerset until 1884, was a British soldier and Conservative politician. He served as Under-Secretary of State for War from 1900 to 1902 and was Lieutenant Governor of the Isle of Man from 1902 to 1919.

== Background and education ==
A member of the Somerset family headed by the Duke of Beaufort, Somerset was the son of Richard Somerset, 2nd Baron Raglan, by his first wife Lady Georgina Lygon, third daughter of Henry Lygon, 4th Earl Beauchamp. He was a godchild of George V of Hanover, Somerset became a Page of Honour to Queen Victoria in 1868, which he remained until 1874. He was educated at Eton and the Royal Military College, Sandhurst.

== Military and political career ==
In 1870 Somerset joined the Grenadier Guards. He fought in the Second Anglo-Afghan War, reaching the rank of captain. He served as Under-Secretary of State for War in the Unionist Government headed by Lord Salisbury from 1900 to 1902.

In September 1902 Lord Raglan was appointed Lieutenant Governor of the Isle of Man. He arrived on the island on 18 October and was sworn in at Castletown on 21 October. During his tenure as Lieutenant Governor he became the Provincial Grand Master of the Freemasons in the Isle of Man from 1912 to 1919 and had the Lord Raglan Lodge No 3685 named in his honour.

Described as "autocratic" and "unpopular", he opposed campaigns by Manx trade unions for direct taxation to fund an old-age pension and in 1918 ordered the removal of flour subsidies which increased the price of bread 15% above that in England. These actions had a direct effect in generating the July 1918 general strike on the island, which resulted in the passing of an act on direct taxation, reduction in bread prices and the introduction of pensions.

Lord Raglan resigned as Governor on 17 December 1918, citing ill-health.

== Family ==
Lord Raglan married Lady Ethel Jemima Ponsonby, daughter of Walter Ponsonby, 7th Earl of Bessborough, on 28 February 1883. Lady Raglan was a one-time President of the Monmouthshire branch of the Soldiers' and Sailors' Families' Association, and died in 1940. They had six children. He died on 24 October 1921, aged 64, and was succeeded in the barony by his son, FitzRoy.

Court offices
Preceded by Arthur Lyttleton	Page of Honour; 1874–1879	Succeeded by Count Edward Gleichen
Political offices
Preceded by George Wyndham	Under-Secretary of State for War; 1900–1902	Succeeded by The Earl of Hardwicke
Government offices
Preceded by The Lord Henniker	Lieutenant Governor of the Isle of Man; 1902–1919	Succeeded by Sir William Fry
Peerage of the United Kingdom
Preceded by Richard Somerset	Baron Raglan; 1884–1921	Succeeded by FitzRoy Somerset
