= Claude Hill =

Lieutenant Governor of the Isle of Man

Sir Claude Hill KCSI CIE

15th Lieutenant Governor of the Isle of Man
- In office 1925–1932
- Monarch: George V
- Preceded by: William Fry
- Succeeded by: Sir Montagu Butler

Personal details
- Born: Claude Hamilton Archer Hill; 1866 Cottingham, East Riding of Yorkshire
- Died: 1934 (aged 67–68)
- Spouse: Frances May West
- Children: One son and two daughters
- Education: Emmanuel College, Cambridge

Sir Claude Hamilton Archer Hill KCSI CIE (1866 – 1934) was Lieutenant Governor of the Isle of Man.

== Career ==
Educated at St Mark's School in Windsor and Emmanuel College, Cambridge, Hill joined the Indian Civil Service in 1887. After a posting as Under Secretary to the Government of India (Home Department) from 1895, he was appointed successively First Assistant Resident at Hyderabad in 1897, Private Secretary to the Governor of Bombay in 1900 and then Deputy Secretary to the Government of India (Foreign Department) in 1903. His later appointments included political secretary to the Governor of Bombay in 1906, then Resident at Mewar and after that, Agent to the Governor at Kathiawar. Later he became a member of the Executive Council of Bombay and subsequently, Finance Member of the Viceroy's Executive Council and Head of the Central Transport and Food Board of India. He retired in 1921.

In retirement he became Director-General of the League of Red Cross Societies and then Lieutenant Governor of the Isle of Man.

== Family ==
In 1892 he married Frances May West; they had a son and two daughters.

Non-profit organization positions
Preceded by Sir David Henderson	Director-General of the League of Red Cross Societies; 1921 – 1925	Succeeded by Ernest Bicknell
Government offices
Preceded by Sir William Fry	Lieutenant Governor of the Isle of Man; 1925–1932	Succeeded by Sir Montagu Butler
