= William Fry (British Army officer) =

British general (1858–1934)

Major-General Sir William Fry KCVO CB

14th Lieutenant Governor of the Isle of Man
- In office 1919–1925
- Monarch: George V
- Preceded by: Lord Raglan
- Succeeded by: Sir Claude Hill

Personal details
- Born: William Fry; 8 September 1858
- Died: 30 March 1934 (aged 75)
- Spouse: Ellen Margaret Goldie-Taubman

Military service
- Allegiance: United Kingdom
- Branch/service: British Army
- Years of service: 1878–1919
- Rank: Major-General
- Commands: Mounted Infantry School; Lancashire Regiment District; East Lancashire Division; 1st London Division; 2/1st London Division; 30th Division
- Battles/wars: Second Anglo-Afghan War; Second Boer War; First World War

Sir William Fry, KCVO, CB (8 September 1858 – 30 March 1934) was a British Army officer who served in the Second Boer War and the First World War, and later became Lieutenant Governor of the Isle of Man.

== Military career ==
Fry joined the British Army in May 1878, when he was commissioned a second lieutenant in the West Yorkshire Regiment. He served in the Second Anglo-Afghan War 1878–1880, was promoted to lieutenant on 7 January 1880, to captain on 20 January 1886, and to major on 27 July 1898.

After the outbreak of the Second Boer War in October 1899, he went with the 2nd Battalion of his regiment to South Africa. The battalion was attached to the field force ordered to relieve the besieged town of Ladysmith in Natal, and as such he took part in the battles of Colenso (December 1899), Spion Kop (January 1900), Vaal Krantz and the Tugela Heights (February 1900). He assumed command of the battalion with the brevet rank of lieutenant colonel on 23 February 1900, a week before the force relieved Ladysmith on 1 March 1900. The battalion stayed in Natal from March to June 1900, and took part in operations at Laing's Nek, then served in Transvaal from July that year. He stayed in South Africa until after the end of the war in June 1902, and left Cape Town on the SS Orient in October that year. For his service in the war he was mentioned in despatches, received the Queen's Medal with five clasps, and was appointed a Companion of the Order of the Bath (CB).

After commanding a battalion of the West Yorks he was promoted to brevet colonel and placed on half-pay from February 1904 onwards. Reverting to normal pay, he was appointed to succeed Colonel Stuart Peter Rolt as commandant of the School of Instruction for Mounted Infantry at Bulford in September 1905, before becoming brigadier general commanding the Lancashire Regiment District in 1907 and was first commander of the East Lancashire Division, part of the newly created Territorial Force (TF), on 1 April 1908.

On 31 October 1910 he went on to be temporary director general of the TF and was allowed to retain his brigadier's rank whilst so employed. and was Commander of the 1st London Division of the TF in February 1912, taking over from Major General Arthur Henniker-Major. On 28 February 1914 he was appointed colonel of the West Yorkshire Regiment.

He served in the First World War as Commander of 30th Division and then as Major-General in Charge of Administration in Ireland until his retirement in 1919.

In retirement he became Lieutenant Governor of the Isle of Man in 1919. He lived at Winkfield in Berkshire.

== Family ==
In 1886, he married Ellen Margaret Goldie-Taubman.

Military offices
New title	GOC East Lancashire Division; 1908–1910	Succeeded by Cecil Park
Preceded by Arthur Henniker-Major	GOC 1st London Division; 1912–1915	Succeeded by Charles Hull
Government offices
Preceded by Lord Raglan	Lieutenant Governor of the Isle of Man; 1919−1925	Succeeded by Sir Claude Hill
