= Laurence Jones (Royal Air Force officer) =

Royal Air Force air marshal

Air Marshal Sir Laurence Jones KCB AFC

25th Lieutenant Governor of the Isle of Man
- In office 10 October 1990 – 27 September 1995
- Monarch: Elizabeth II
- Preceded by: Sir Laurence New
- Succeeded by: Sir Timothy Daunt

Personal details
- Born: 18 January 1933
- Died: 27 September 1995 (aged 62)
- Education: Trinity School

Military service
- Allegiance: United Kingdom
- Branch/service: Royal Air Force
- Years of service: 1951–1990
- Rank: Air Marshal
- Commands: Air Member for Personnel (1987–90); RAF Wittering (1975–77); No. 92 Squadron (1967–70); No. 8 Squadron (1961–63)
- Awards: Knight Commander of the Order of the Bath; Air Force Cross

Sir Laurence Alfred Jones, KCB, AFC (18 January 1933 – 27 September 1995) was a senior Royal Air Force commander.

== RAF career ==
Educated at Trinity School, Jones joined the Royal Air Force in 1951. He was made Officer Commanding No. 8 Squadron in 1961 and Officer Commanding No. 19 Squadron in 1967. He was appointed Station Commander at RAF Wittering in 1975 and Director of Operations (Air Support) in 1977 before becoming Senior Air Staff Officer at Headquarters RAF Strike Command in 1982. He then went on to be Assistant Chief of the Air Staff (Operations) in 1984, Assistant Chief of the Defence Staff (Programmes) in 1985 and Assistant Chief of the Air Staff in 1986 before being appointed Air Member for Personnel in 1987 and retiring in 1990.

In retirement he became Lieutenant Governor of the Isle of Man.

Military offices
Preceded by Sir Anthony Skingsley	Air Member for Personnel; 1987–1989	Succeeded by Sir David Parry-Evans
Government offices
Preceded by Sir Laurence New	Lieutenant Governor of the Isle of Man; 1990–1995	Succeeded by Sir Timothy Daunt
