= John Paul (colonial administrator) =

British colonial administrator and civil servant (1916–2004)

Sir John Paul GCMG OBE MC

22nd Lieutenant Governor of the Isle of Man
- In office 1974–1980
- Monarch: Elizabeth II
- Preceded by: Peter Stallard
- Succeeded by: Nigel Cecil

1st Governor-General of the Bahamas
- In office 10 July 1973 – 31 July 1973
- Monarch: Elizabeth II
- Prime Minister: Lynden Pindling
- Preceded by: Position established
- Succeeded by: Milo Butler

Governor of the Bahamas
- In office 14 May 1972 – 10 July 1973
- Monarch: Elizabeth II
- Preceded by: Francis Hovell-Thurlow-Cumming-Bruce
- Succeeded by: Position abolished

Governor of British Honduras
- In office 11 July 1966 – 26 January 1972
- Monarch: Elizabeth II
- Preceded by: Peter Stallard
- Succeeded by: Richard Posnett

1st Governor-General of the Gambia
- In office 18 February 1965 – 9 February 1966
- Monarch: Elizabeth II
- Prime Minister: Dawda Jawara
- Preceded by: Position created
- Succeeded by: Farimang Mamadi Singateh

Governor of the Gambia
- In office 29 March 1962 – 18 February 1965
- Monarch: Elizabeth II
- Prime Minister: Dawda Jawara
- Preceded by: Edward Henry Windley
- Succeeded by: Position abolished

Personal details
- Born: John Warburton Paul; 29 March 1916 Weymouth, Dorset
- Died: 31 March 2004 (aged 88)
- Spouse: (Kathleen) Audrey Weeden
- Children: Three daughters
- Education: Selwyn College, Cambridge

Military service
- Allegiance: United Kingdom
- Branch/service: British Army
- Years of service: 1937–1947
- Rank: Captain
- Battles/wars: World War II

Sir John Warburton Paul, GCMG, OBE, MC (29 March 1916 – 31 March 2004) was a British colonial administrator and civil servant, who most notably served as the final Governor of the Gambia (1962–1965) and Governor of the Bahamas (1972–1973) prior to both of those countries achieving independence from the United Kingdom. Paul also served as the first Governor-General of the Gambia from 1965 to 1966, the Governor of British Honduras from 1966 to 1972, the first Governor-General of the Bahamas in 1973, and the Lieutenant Governor of the Isle of Man from 1974 to 1980.

== Early life and education ==
Paul was born in Weymouth, Dorset, and attended Weymouth College. He went on to study at Selwyn College, Cambridge.

== Military service ==
He was commissioned into the Royal Tank Corps Supplementary Reserve in 1937 and into the regular Royal Tank Regiment in 1938. He won a Military Cross for his bravery during the German invasion of France in 1940. However, he was captured by the Germans in 1940 and was a prisoner of war until the end of the war in 1945. He was promoted Lieutenant in 1941 and Captain in 1946 and resigned his commission in 1947.

== Colonial career ==
Following the war, Paul entered colonial administration, serving in various position in Sierra Leone until its independence in 1961. He was knighted in 1962, becoming the Governor of the Gambia. He served until that country's independence in February 1965, and became its first Governor-General. In 1966, he was replaced in this role by a Gambian doctor. He then went on to become Governor of British Honduras, from 1966 to 1972. He dealt with demonstrations which were sparked by rumours that the territory was to be annexed by Guatemala.

Paul then went on to become the last Governor of the Bahamas, serving from 1972 to 1973. He continued to serve as acting Governor-General for a period in 1973 following independence. His last role in the colonial service was a Lieutenant Governor of the Isle of Man, which he held from 1974 to 1980. Following that he retired from colonial administration.

== Personal life ==
Paul married (Kathleen) Audrey Weeden in 1946. They had three daughters and were married for 58 years, until he died in March 2004. Audrey died in December 2004.

Government offices
Preceded by Sir Edward Henry Windley	Governor of The Gambia; 1962–1965	Post abolished
New creation	Governor-General of The Gambia; 1965–1966	Succeeded by Farimang Mamadi Singateh
Preceded by Sir Peter Stallard	Governor of British Honduras; 1966–1972	Succeeded by Sir Richard Neil Posnett
Preceded by Lord Thurlow	Governor of the Bahamas; 1972–1973	Post abolished
New creation	Governor-General of the Bahamas July 1973	Succeeded by Sir Milo Butler
Preceded by Sir Peter Stallard	Lieutenant Governor of the Isle of Man; 1974–1980	Succeeded by Sir Nigel Cecil
