= Timothy Daunt =

British diplomat (1935–2023)

Sir Timothy Daunt KCMG

26th Lieutenant Governor of the Isle of Man
- In office 27 October 1995 – 1 September 2000
- Monarch: Elizabeth II
- Preceded by: Sir Laurence Jones
- Succeeded by: Sir Ian Macfadyen

Personal details
- Born: Timothy Lewis Achilles Daunt; 11 October 1935
- Died: 5 August 2023 (aged 87) London, England
- Spouse: Patricia Susan Knight (m. 1962)
- Children: James Daunt
- Relatives: Achilles Daunt (great grandfather)
- Education: St Catharine's College, Cambridge

Military service
- Allegiance: United Kingdom
- Branch/service: British Army
- Years of service: 1955–1957
- Rank: Lieutenant

Viceregal styles of Sir Timothy Daunt (1995–2000)
- Reference style: His Excellency
- Spoken style: Your Excellency

Sir Timothy Lewis Achilles Daunt KCMG (11 October 1935 – 5 August 2023) was a British diplomat and Lieutenant Governor of the Isle of Man.

== Early life ==
Daunt was educated at Sherborne School and St Catharine's College, Cambridge.

== Career ==
Daunt was commissioned into the Royal Armoured Corps in 1955 and posted to the 8th King's Royal Irish Hussars. After completing national service, he joined the diplomatic service and, after a series of postings, became Permanent Representative to NATO in Brussels in 1982 and then British Ambassador to Turkey from 1986 to his retirement in 1992.

In retirement he became Lieutenant Governor of the Isle of Man. He later became chairman of the Ottoman Fund, a business established to provide mortgages for properties in Turkey.

== Personal life and death ==
In 1962 he married Patricia Susan Knight (1938–2023). He died of the effects of cerebral vasculitis on 5 August 2023, at the age of 87. Lady Daunt died on 2 October 2023, at the age of 84.

Government offices
Preceded by Sir Laurence Jones	Lieutenant Governor of the Isle of Man; 1995–2000	Succeeded by Ian Macfadyen
