= Peter Stallard =

British colonial administrator (1915-1995)

Sir Peter Stallard KCMG CVO MBE

21st Lieutenant Governor of the Isle of Man
- In office 1966–1974
- Monarch: Elizabeth II
- Preceded by: Sir Ronald Garvey
- Succeeded by: Sir John Paul

Personal details
- Born: Peter Hyla Gawne Stallard; 6 March 1915
- Died: 25 October 1995 (aged 80)
- Spouse: Mary Elizabeth Kirke
- Children: One son and one daughter
- Education: Corpus Christi College, Oxford

Military service
- Allegiance: United Kingdom
- Branch/service: British Army
- Years of service: 1939-1945
- Rank: Lieutenant-Colonel
- Battles/wars: World War II

Sir Peter Hyla Gawne Stallard KCMG CVO MBE (6 March 1915 – 25 October 1995) was Lieutenant Governor of the Isle of Man from 1967 to 1972.

== Career ==
Educated at Bromsgrove School and Corpus Christi College, Oxford, Stallard joined the colonial service in Nigeria in 1937. He served in West Africa and Burma during World War II being given an emergency commission in 1941 and reaching the rank of Lieutenant-Colonel by the end of the War. He later re-joined the colonial service, becoming Secretary to the Prime Minister of the Federation of Nigeria in 1957 in the run-up to independence before moving on to be Governor of British Honduras in 1961, where he arrived in the aftermath of serious hurricane damage. He retired in 1966.

In retirement he became Lieutenant Governor of the Isle of Man: in August 1973 the Summerland disaster took place. and he had to contend with calls for independence from Manx people. He later chaired an inquiry into military training on Dartmoor.

== Family ==
In 1941 he married Mary Elizabeth Kirke; they had one son and one daughter.

Government offices
Preceded by Colin Thornley	Governor of British Honduras; 1961–1966	Succeeded by Sir John Paul
Preceded by Sir Ronald Garvey	Lieutenant Governor of the Isle of Man; 1966–1974	Succeeded by Sir John Paul
