= Cornelius Smelt =

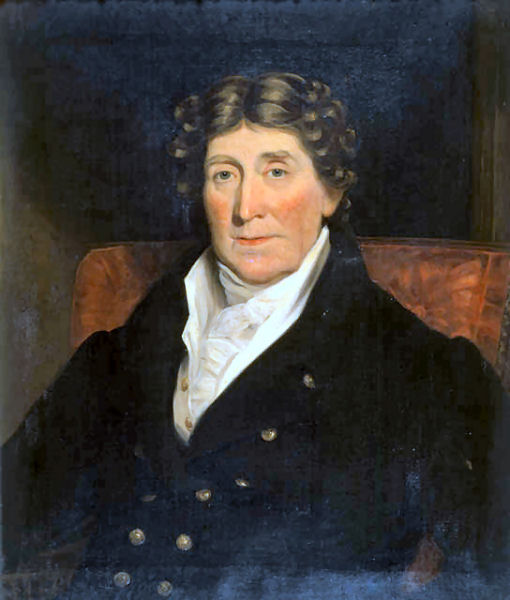
- 1826 portrait by Thomas Barber.

5th Lieutenant Governor of the Isle of Man
- In office 1805–1832
- Monarchs: George III, George IV, William IV
- Preceded by: Lord Henry Murray
- Succeeded by: John Ready

Personal details
- Born: Cornelius Smelt; August 1748
- Died: 28 November 1832 (aged 84)
- Spouse(s): Mary Trant Ottley; Anne Hale
- Relations: Leonard Smelt

Military service
- Allegiance: United Kingdom
- Branch/service: British Army
- Rank: Colonel
- Unit: 14th Regiment of Foot; 35th (Royal Sussex) Regiment of Foot
- Battles/wars: American War of Independence

Cornelius Smelt (August 1748 – 28 November 1832) was an administrator who served as Lieutenant Governor of the Isle of Man from 1805 until his death in 1832, the longest governorship in the history of the Island. An officer in the British Army, he served first with the 14th Regiment of Foot and then the 35th (Royal Sussex) Regiment of Foot, acting as Deputy Governor of Southsea Castle in the late 18th century. His governorship of the Isle of Man is remembered as one in which he displayed great moral courage in difficult circumstances. His wisdom and fortitude in the long period when the House of Keys and the Duke of Atholl fought their historic political battles were also evident. Upon his death, a memorial was erected in Castletown in the Isle of Man.

== Biography ==
=== Early life ===
Cornelius Smelt was born in August 1748 in Upper Swaledale, Yorkshire, as the son of Cornelius Smelt and the grandson of William Smelt and Dorothy Cayley. Smelt's paternal uncle, Leonard Smelt of Langton, North Yorkshire, was Sub-Governor to the future King George IV, and he sent his nephew to a military academy.

=== Military career ===
Smelt served in the British Army, beginning his career with the 14th Regiment of Foot, and was promoted to lieutenant on 2 March 1772. Four years later, on 9 July 1776, he was gazetted to the 35th (Royal Sussex) Regiment of Foot with whom he saw action in various campaigns during the American War of Independence. On 17 July 1787, as a captain, he was assigned as Deputy Governor of Southsea Castle. Smelt's military career spanned forty six years, including his time as a member of the North York Militia (major 1797, lieutenant-colonel 1803, shortly before his retirement).

=== Governorship of the Isle of Man ===
On 15 June 1805, Smelt became the first royally appointed Lieutenant Governor of the Isle of Man. Governor Smelt's political liberalism was seen as a balance for the Dukes of Atholl, who ruled the Isle of Man first as Kings of Mann, then Lords of Mann, and during Smelt's time, Governors of the Isle of Man. He was appointed as "Inspecting Field-Officer of Fencibles and Volunteers in the Isle of Man" on 26 October 1805, granting him the temporary rank of lieutenant colonel. He acted as a restraining influence on some of the modernising ambitions of John Murray, 4th Duke of Atholl, the last Governor.

By 1812 the situation between the Duke of Atholl and Governor Smelt resulted in the Duke requesting that Smelt should vacate the Governor's House at Castle Rushen in order that he could reside there whenever he visited the Isle of Man, insisting that Smelt took residence at The George Inn.

Smelt himself when writing to the Home Office in 1812 frankly declared he was:

"disliked in very high degree by the Duke. It had been a necessity on certain occasions to oppose pretensions of the Duke when they have been at issue with the King's rights, leading to decline his [the Duke's] repeated offers which he made a short time ago to induce me to resign my situation of Lieutenant Governor in order that some persons more subservient to his views, and on that account there is great animosity."

— Cornelius Smelt. Castletown, December 6th, 1812.

The Duke persisted in his harsh treatment of Smelt. On December 7, 1812, the Duke wrote a letter to the Secretary of State for the Home Department, Henry Addington, 1st Viscount Sidmouth, complaining that Smelt:

"gave a peremptory refusal contrary to all right and precedent to give me as Governor the accommodation of the Governor's House within the walls of Castle Rushen, and without accommodation I cannot attend upon my public duty in health and comfort to meet and provide for the present state of society and the welfare of his Majesty's subjects by such new and suitable provisions and enactments."

— John Murray, 4th Duke of Atholl, December 7th, 1812.

The Duke of Atholl concludes by asking for possession of all public documents as well as the house. Smelt replied to Lord Sidmouth stating that Atholl could use the Courthouse in Douglas, which was deemed better than Castle Rushen, for the Chancery Courts.

Lord Sidmouth replied to the Duke, recommending him not to persist with regard to the Governor's House, stating that the Governor's House had been designed by His Majesty's Government as a residence for the Lieutenant Governor. Although the Duke of Atholl persisted in his right to the Governor's House, Smelt was not evicted.

In a letter written by Colonel Mark Wilks to Lord Powys in 1812, it was suggested that Smelt was appointed by the Government in order to:

"extinguish the Duke of Atholl's attempt to make the Duke's brother his Deputy Governor, and that the essence of the same plan has, however, but remained in a dormant state, and are now revived by a pending negotiation for removing this gentleman in order to make room for a dependent of the Duke of Atholl."

— Colonel Mark Wilks, Castletown, 1812.

Colonel Wilks was voicing the opinion of the House of Keys, of which he was a member, when he declared in further correspondence that:

"the people of the Isle would be sorry to object to the removal to a better office of Governor Smelt, an honest and independent man; but they most anxiously pray the good offices of Lord Powys that he [Smelt] may not be succeeded by a person under the influence of the Duke of Atholl."

— Colonel Mark Wilks, Castletown, 1812.

The Attorney General of the Isle of Man was at the time William Frankland, said to have been a relative of Smelt. Frankland declared in a letter to the Home office that Governor Smelt was:

"an old soldier and gentleman of the old school - composed, discreet, courteous, affable, yet firm and resolute."

— William Frankland.

In 1816 Frankland was succeeded in the office of Attorney General by John Clarke who, in a letter to the Home Office relative to the constant disputes with the Duke of Atholl, said that:

"the Lieutenant Governor had certainly conducted himself with great good temper and singular discretion."

— John Clarke.

=== Death ===
Feeling acutely with regard to his health and his position, only seventeen days before his death, on November 11, 1832, Smelt wrote to the Home Secretary asking to be appointed Governor-in-Chief, with a Lieutenant Governor to do the work and permission to stay on in the Governor's House in Castle Rushen. He died in office on 28 November 1832 at Castle Rushen, and was buried under the altar at St Mary's Church in Castletown, his funeral was conducted by the Rector of Ballaugh, the Reverend Hugh Stowell, the oration stating:

"Never since the days of good Bishop Wilson has the Island had to mourn the loss of a more justly esteemed and popular man."

When St Mary's Church was deconsecrated in the 1980s, his body was exhumed and reinterred in the Bacon family vault alongside his daughter at St Peter's Church in Onchan.

=== Family ===
In 1785 he married Mary Trant Ottley. Following her death at the age of 34, he married Anne Hale. He had children from both marriages.

== Smelt portrait ==
While Governor Smelt was at the height of his popularity a meeting was held on August 10, 1826, at the George Inn, Castletown, there being present some of the highest officials then residing in Castletown, Chairman of the meeting being Colonel Mark Wilks. At the meeting a resolution was passed to commission a portrait of Governor Smelt, the artist engaged being Thomas Barber; the sum of £52 being raised through subscription. Governor Smelt, however, did not desire that his memory should not be: "transmitted to posterity in this way," and in a letter addressed to Colonel Wilks he declined having his portrait placed in the Keys Chamber, which was then situated in Parliament Square, Castletown. The portrait was purchased by Capt. Caesar Bacon, husband of Smelt's daughter, and was placed in his home at Seafield, Santon. The portrait stayed in the family until 1925 when it was presented to the Manx Museum.

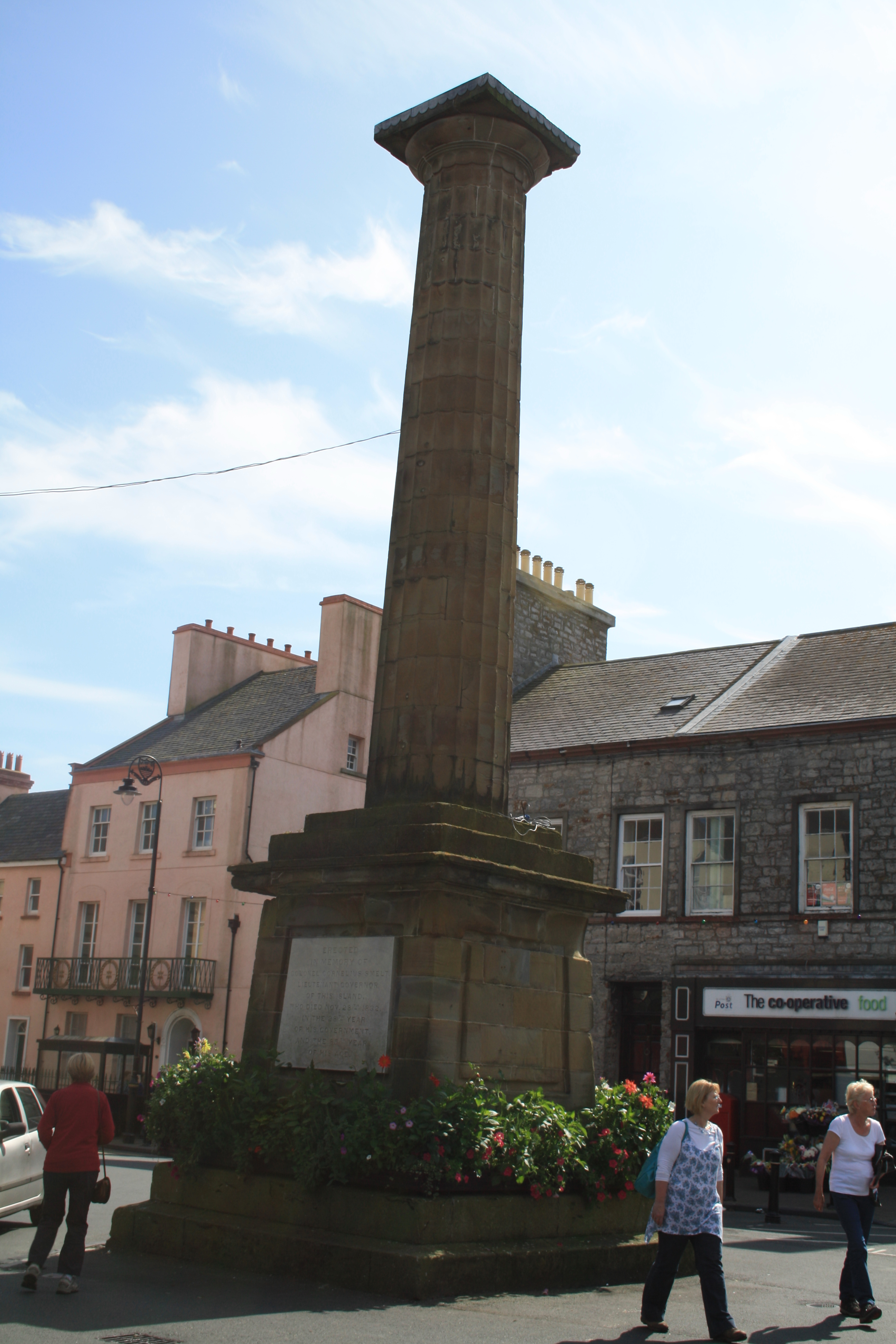
The Smelt Monument, situated in the ancient market square of Castletown, Isle of Man

== Smelt Monument ==
After Smelt's death in 1832, Sir William Hillary proposed that a memorial be built, and it was decided that a column should be erected, with the funds for the painting providing a basis for the funding. Further money was raised, and John Welch, an architect, drew up two designs, one for an obelisk, and the other a Grecian Doric. The latter was chosen, and was built by John Thomas. There was little celebration of the monument, with minimal coverage in the newspapers of the time. A tongue-in-cheek proposal by the Castletown Commissioners to remove the monument in 2009 drew an angry reaction from the public.

Government offices
Preceded by Lord Henry Murray	Lieutenant Governor of the Isle of Man; 1805–1832	Succeeded by John Ready
