= Mark Herdman =

Mark Herdman CBE LVO

Governor of the British Virgin Islands
- In office 1986–1991
- Preceded by: David Robert Barwick
- Succeeded by: Peter Penfold

Deputy Governor of Bermuda
- In office 1983–1986
- Governor: John Morrison

Governor of Bermuda (acting)
- In office 14 February 1983 – July 1983
- Preceded by: Richard Posnett
- Succeeded by: John Morrison

Personal details
- Born: 26 April 1932 Rhu, Scotland, UK
- Died: 5 August 2015 (aged 83)
- Spouse: Elizabeth Dillon (m. 1963–2015)
- Children: Patrick; Deirdre; Bridget
- Education: Trinity College Dublin; The Queen's College, Oxford

John Mark Ambrose Herdman CBE LVO (26 April 1932 – 5 August 2015) was a British diplomat and overseas civil servant. Herdman served as the Deputy Governor of Bermuda from 1983 to 1986 (with a period as Bermuda's acting Governor in 1983) and then as the Governor of the British Virgin Islands from 1986 until 1991.

== Biography ==
=== Early life and education ===
Mark Herdman was born in Rhu, Scotland, on 26 April 1932, to Joan (née Tennant) and Claud Herdman, a Commander of the Royal Navy. His mother, Joan, died in 1936 when he was four years old. Herdman was brought up by a paternal aunt in Northern Ireland until his father remarried in 1939. The Herdman family owned and operated a linen factory in Sion Mills in County Tyrone. They had established the village of Sion Mills in 1835.

Herdman attended St Edward's School, a boarding school in Oxford, and later graduated from Trinity College Dublin. He then enrolled at The Queen's College, Oxford, for one year, to prepare for a posting in the British Overseas Civil Service.

=== Diplomatic career ===
Herdman first served as a District Officer and later as a District Commissioner in British Kenya, until the country gained independence from the United Kingdom in 1964.

After leaving Kenya, Herdman transferred from the British Overseas Civil Service to Her Majesty's Diplomatic Service. He studied Arabic at the Middle East Centre for Arab Studies (MECAS) in Shemlan, Lebanon, to prepare for a posting in neighbouring Jordan. He then served at diplomatic embassies and missions in Zambia, Saudi Arabia and Malawi. Queen Elizabeth II named Herdman as a lieutenant in the Royal Victorian Order during her trip to Malawi in 1979.

=== Deputy Governor of Bermuda ===
Mark Herdman was appointed Deputy Governor of Bermuda from 1983 to 1986, including a brief tenure as acting Governor from 14 February 1983 until July 1983, following the resignation of Governor Richard Posnett.

=== Governor of British Virgin Islands ===
Herdman was appointed Governor of the British Virgin Islands from 1986 to 1991.

In 1989, Hurricane Hugo struck the British Virgin Islands in 1989 during Herdman's tenure, devastating the islands. Hurricane Hugo was the first major hurricane to strike the territory since 1960. Governor Herdman oversaw the British Virgin Islands' emergency management programs and recovery efforts in the aftermath of Hurricane Hugo. Herdman appointed the BVI's first full-time disaster preparedness coordinator, which led to founding of the Department of Disaster Management of the British Virgin Islands in 1993, after he left office.

In 1990, Herdman was named as a Commander of the Order of the British Empire.

In a statement following his death in 2015, Premier Orlando Smith praised Herdman's role in the territory's recovery from Hurricane Hugo, noting that he had "helped to lay the foundation for the development of the modern Virgin Islands' disaster management systems and operations."

=== Later life ===
He left his position in the British Virgin Islands in 1991. Herdman served as a member of the European Union's Peace Monitoring Mission during the break-up of Yugoslavia before retiring from diplomacy in 1992.

Mark Herdman died on 5 August 2015 at the age of 83. He was survived by his wife, Elizabeth (Betsy) Dillon, whom he married in 1963, with whom he had three children, Patrick, Deirdre, and Bridget, and four grandchildren. He was buried at St. Mary's Church in Worplesdon, Guildford, Surrey, on 25 August 2015.
