= Nigel Cecil =

British naval officer (1925–2017)

Rear-Admiral Sir Nigel Cecil KBE CB EsqStJ

23rd Lieutenant Governor of the Isle of Man
- In office 1 October 1980 – 25 September 1985
- Monarch: Elizabeth II
- Preceded by: Sir John Paul
- Succeeded by: Sir Laurence New

Personal details
- Born: Oswald Nigel Amherst Cecil; 11 November 1925
- Died: 10 March 2017 (aged 91)
- Spouse: Annette Barclay (m. 1961)
- Children: Robert Barclay Amherst Cecil
- Education: Ludgrove School
- Alma mater: Royal Naval College, Dartmouth

Military service
- Allegiance: United Kingdom
- Branch/service: Royal Navy
- Rank: Rear-Admiral
- Commands: HMS Corunna; HMS Royal Arthur

Rear-Admiral Sir Oswald Nigel Amherst Cecil, KBE CB EsqStJ (11 November 1925 – 10 March 2017) was a British naval officer.

== Early life ==
Oswald Nigel Amherst Cecil was born 11 November 1925, to Commander Hon. Henry Mitford Amherst Cecil (1893–1963) and Hon. Yvonne Cornwallis (1896–1983). Cecil is a paternal grandson of Lord William Cecil (1854–1943) and the 2nd Baroness Amherst of Hackney (1857–1919) and a maternal grandson of the 1st Baron Cornwallis (1864–1935). He was educated at Ludgrove School and the Royal Naval College, Dartmouth.

== Naval career ==
In 1959, he reached the rank of commander. From 1961 to 1963, Cecil commanded HMS Corunna in the Mediterranean and then HMS Royal Arthur from 1963 to 1965. In 1966, he was promoted to the rank of captain.

Cecil returned to Dartmouth to command a training squadron from 1969 to 1971. In 1968 he was made an Esquire (Esq.St.J. the lowest grade) in the Venerable Order of Saint John.

Cecil received the acting rank of commodore in 1971 and was sent to South Africa as a Naval attaché to Cape Town until 1973. He was then a director of the Naval Operational Requirements from 1973 to 1975. On 7 January 1975, he was appointed a Naval aide-de-camp to Queen Elizabeth II. He left this position on being promoted to rear admiral on 7 July 1975. He then became the NATO Commander of the South East Mediterranean and Flag Officer, Malta. In the 1978 New Year Honours, he was made a Companion of the Order of the Bath (CB).

Cecil left the island with the last of the British Forces in 1979 on 31 March on what is called Freedom day aboard HMS London, the last ship to leave Malta when the Maltese government closed the base. ON 16 June 1979, he was made a Knight Commander of the Order of the British Empire (KBE). He retired from the navy on 15 September 1979.

On 9 September 1980, Cecil became Lieutenant Governor of the Isle of Man, a post he held for five years. Also in 1980, he was promoted to Knight of the Order of Saint John (K.St.J.).

== Personal life ==
On 6 April 1961, he married Annette Barclay (born 1934), daughter of Major Robert Edward Barclay of Mathers and Urie (1906–1959) and Nesta Anne Bury-Barry (1909–2004). Together they had:

- Robert Barclay Amherst Cecil (born 1965), who married Laurie A. Kohan

Cecil, who lived with his wife of over fifty-five years, on the Isle of Wight, died on 10 March 2017, at the age of 91.

Military offices
Preceded by David Loram	Flag Officer, Malta; 1975–1979	Succeeded by Post abolished
Government offices
Preceded by Sir John Paul	Lieutenant Governor of the Isle of Man; 1980–1985	Succeeded by Sir Laurence New
