= John Oswald (British Army officer) =

British Army officer (1771–1840)

General Sir John Oswald GCB GCMG
- Born: 2 October 1771; Dunnikier, Fife, Scotland
- Died: 8 June 1840 (aged 68); Dunnikier, Fife, Scotland
- Military career
- Allegiance: United Kingdom
- Branch: (United Kingdom) British Army
- Service years: 1788 to 1840
- Rank: General
- Conflicts: French Revolutionary Wars; Capture of Martinique, St Lucia and Guadeloupe; Invasion of the Netherlands; Capture of Malta; Napoleonic Wars; Battle of Maida; Alexandria expedition of 1807; Capture of the Ionian Islands; Battle of Osma; Battle of Vitoria; Siege of San Sebastian
- Awards: Knight Grand Cross of the Order of the Bath; Knight Grand Cross of the Order of St Michael and St George

General Sir John Oswald GCB GCMG (2 October 1771 – 8 June 1840) was a prominent British Army officer during the French Revolutionary and Napoleonic Wars whose service was conducted in seven different theatres of war. Oswald was born in Fife and educated in France, which gave him both excellent command of the French language and close connections with the French aristocracy. The excesses of the French Revolution gave him a hatred of the French Republic and later Empire, and his exemplary service in the West Indies, the Netherlands, Malta, Italy, Egypt, the Adriatic and finally the Peninsular War demonstrated both his keen tactical and strategic understanding his and personal courage.

Highly commended for his war service, Oswald later took an interest in politics, unsuccessfully attempting to enter parliament but using his influence in the army to support the Conservatives. He married twice and had several children, and was invested in two knightly orders following his retirement from the army in recognition of his service. He died in 1840 at his family estate in Fife.

== Early life ==
John Oswald was born in 1771 in Fife, the son of James Townsend Oswald. In approximately 1785 he was sent to school in France, the prestigious military academy at Brienne-le-Château, where he formed a lasting friendship with Louis-Antoine Fauvelet de Bourrienne, future secretary to Napoleon. Oswald spent many school holidays with his friends in Paris and developed an affection for France and the French language that he retained throughout his life. Oswald returned to Britain in 1788 and purchased a commission as a second lieutenant in the 23rd Regiment of Foot, he was promoted first lieutenant on transfer to the 7th Regiment of Foot the following year. In 1790 he was with his regiment when they were stationed at Gibraltar and in 1791 was given an independent company as a temporary captain, an appointment confirmed two months later accompanied by a transfer to the 35th Regiment of Foot.

The French Revolution and the consequent Reign of Terror resulted in the deaths of many of Oswald's school friends, creating in Oswald a lifelong hatred of the French Republic and the principles it was based on. At the outbreak of the French Revolutionary Wars, the 35th was ordered to the West Indies, Oswald resigning his appointment as a staff officer (brigade major) to accompany them. A few months later, Oswald was serving in the Caribbean with a detachment of local troops with the temporary rank of major. In this role he participated in the capture of Martinique, St Lucia and Guadeloupe and the invasion of San Domingo, before being sent back to Britain in 1795 to act as a recruiting officer. He was promoted to the regimental rank of major on 22 September 1795, and on 1 April 1797, Oswald purchased the rank of lieutenant colonel and command of the 35th.

== Military service ==
In 1799, Oswald and his regiment participated in the failed invasion of the Netherlands, where he was seriously wounded at the Battle of Bergen and transported home. In 1800 the regiment was attached to the force under Henry Pigot that operated against Malta from Minorca. Oswald was present at the invasion of Malta and the successful siege of Valletta. He took over official command of the regiment in the aftermath of this operation and remained in the Mediterranean until the Peace of Amiens in 1802.

When the Napoleonic Wars broke out in 1803, Oswald returned to Malta to rejoin his regiment. In 1805, the 35th was attached to General Sir James Craig's force that landed in Sicily and Oswald took part the following year in the invasion of Calabria under Sir John Stuart, fighting at the Battle of Maida and besieging Scylla Castle and forcing its surrender. On his return to Sicily, Oswald was appointed brigadier-general. He was promoted colonel on 2 November 1805.

In 1807, Oswald and the 35th were sent to Egypt under Alexander Mackenzie-Fraser participating in the Alexandria expedition of 1807 against the Ottoman Empire. Oswald was particularly noted for his actions in the storming of a Turkish trench line that forced the Ottoman troops to retreat into Alexandria's city walls. After the surrender of the city, Oswald advanced to Rosetta and there fought a running battle for fifteen days against superior Turkish forces before being ordered to withdraw. Returning to Sicily in 1808, Oswald was detached from his regiment and took command of a brigade, participating in raids on the Italian coast and commanding at first Augusta and subsequently Procida, which he had helped capture. In 1809, Oswald was given command of the force sent to invade the Ionian Islands, capturing Zante, Ithaca, Cephalonia and Cerigo.

In 1810, still in the Adriatic, Oswald gathered 2,000 British and Greeks soldiers and invaded Santa Maura, capturing the island in eight days despite some heavy fighting. For these exploits Oswald was made governor of the islands, simultaneously allowing the Greek population its first measure of independence, maintaining British rule and forming good diplomatic relations with the Turkish governors of mainland Greece. In 1811 he returned to Britain leaving Richard Church in command of the islands although Oswald retained the title governor until 1815. On his return, Oswald was promoted to major-general and married Charlotte Murray-Aynsley, granddaughter of the Duke of Atholl.

In October 1812, Oswald was attached to the general staff of the British Army in Spain fighting the Peninsular War. Oswald's arrival coincided with the army's retreat from Burgos, during which Oswald was with the Duke of Wellington at a cavalry rearguard action on 24 October and later that week took temporary command of the 5th Division. In command of this force, Oswald was engaged with the French at Villa Muriel and along the River Carrión and saw it into winter quarters on the River Douro. In the spring of 1813, Oswald commanded the division on Wellington's march through Spain and was engaged at the Battle of Osma on 17 June and the much larger Battle of Vittoria four days later.

== Retirement ==
Following Vittoria, Oswald lead the division to the Siege of San Sebastian, but was replaced by the returning General James Leith two days before the assault on 31 August. Oswald, now commanding a brigade, was wounded in the attack on the city and returned to Britain to recuperate. While in England, Oswald was recalled to his father's estates, which fell to him as the result of the recent death of his elder brother and his father's failing health. Oswald retired from active service and managed his father's property, receiving the thanks of parliament for his service and two gold medals with clasps for Maida, Vittoria and San Sebastian. In 1815, Oswald was listed 54th amongst the first appointments as Knight Commander of the Order of the Bath (KCB) on the restructuring of the order, and continued to accumulate awards, honours and promotions during his retirement, becoming Colonel Commandant of one of the battalions in the Rifle Brigade and later Colonel of the Regiment of the 35th Regiment of Foot, and also a deputy lieutenant of Fife. He was advanced to full general and made Knight Grand Cross of both the Order of the Bath (GCB) and the Order of St Michael and St George (GCMG).

Oswald was a staunch conservative who once ran unsuccessfully for Member of Parliament for the constituency of Fife. Oswald remained a popular figure in British society and politics until his death, noted for his bravery, good looks, public speaking and literary tastes. Following the death of his first wife in 1827, he married her cousin Amelia (Emily) Jane Murray, daughter of Lord Henry Murray.

Oswald died on 8 June 1840 at his home in Fife.
