= Peter Gillmore =

British Royal Air Force officer

- Born: 17 October 1905
- Died: 27 May 1996 (aged 90); Henley-on-Thames, England
- Military career
- Allegiance: United Kingdom
- Branch: Royal Air Force
- Service years: 1923–59
- Rank: Air Vice Marshal
- Commands: RAF Staff College, Bracknell (1951–53); No. 64 (Northern) Group (1948–51); RAF Wick (1943–44)
- Conflicts: Second World War; Malayan Emergency
- Awards: Companion of the Order of the Bath; Commander of the Order of the British Empire

Air Vice Marshal Alan David "Peter" Gillmore, CB, CBE (17 October 1905 – 27 May 1996) was a Royal Air Force officer who served as Commandant of the RAF Staff College, Bracknell.

== RAF career ==
Gillmore graduated from the RAF College Cranwell in 1925. He became a flight commander first with No. 201 Squadron in early 1935 and then with No. 202 Squadron later in the year. He served in the Second World War on the staff in the Directorate of Plans at the Air Ministry before becoming Station Commander at RAF Wick in 1943, Director of Operations (Maritime) in 1944 and Air Officer Commanding at Air Headquarters West Africa in 1945. After the war he became Director of Postings at the Air Ministry in 1946, Air Officer Commanding No. 64 Group in 1948 and Commandant of the RAF Staff College, Bracknell in 1951. His last postings were as Senior Air Staff Officer, Far East Air Force in 1953 and then as Senior Air Staff Officer, Home Command in 1956 before retiring in 1959.

== Family ==
In 1931 Gillmore married Kathleen Morris; they had three sons.

Military offices
Preceded by Donald Hardman	Commandant of the RAF Staff College, Bracknell; 1951–1953	Succeeded by Douglas Macfadyen
