= Laurence New =

British Army general

Major-General Sir Laurence New KStJ CB CBE
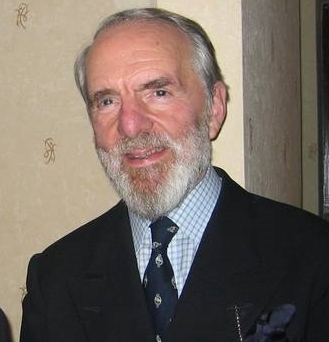

24th Lieutenant Governor of the Isle of Man
- In office 5 October 1985 – 10 October 1990
- Monarch: Elizabeth II
- Preceded by: Sir Nigel Cecil
- Succeeded by: Sir Laurence Jones

Personal details
- Born: Laurence Anthony Wallis New; 25 February 1932 (age 94)
- Spouse: Anna Doreen Verity
- Children: Two sons and two daughters
- Education: King William's College

Military service
- Allegiance: United Kingdom
- Branch/service: British Army
- Years of service: 1952–1985
- Rank: Major-General
- Commands: 4th Royal Tank Regiment
- Awards: Companion of the Order of the Bath; Commander of the Order of the British Empire

Sir Laurence Anthony Wallis New KStJ, CB, CBE (born 25 February 1932) is a former British Army officer who served as Assistant Chief of the General Staff and Assistant Chief of the Defence Staff in the mid-1980s.

== Military career ==
Educated at King William's College located in Castletown on the Isle of Man and the Royal Military Academy Sandhurst, New was commissioned into the Royal Tank Regiment in 1952. He was appointed Brigade Major of 20th Armoured Brigade in 1968, commanding officer of 4th Royal Tank Regiment in 1971 and Defence and Military attaché in Tel Aviv in 1974. He then went on to be Brigadier General Staff (Intelligence) dealing with Northern Ireland intelligence in 1980, chief of staff at the Defence Intelligence Centre for the Falklands War in 1982 before becoming Assistant Chief of the General Staff in 1983. He went on to be Assistant Chief of the Defence Staff in 1984 before retiring in 1985. He was also colonel commandant of the Royal Tank Regiment from 1986 to 1993.

In retirement he became Lieutenant Governor of the Isle of Man as well as presiding officer of the Tynwald. He was also president of the Soldiers' and Airmen's Scripture Readers Association and international president of the Association of Military Christian Fellowships and has written a history of the 4th and 7th Royal Tank Regiments.

== Family ==
In 1956 he married Anna Doreen Verity; they have two sons and two daughters.

== Honours ==
New was appointed a Commander (Military Division) of the Order of the British Empire in the 1980 Birthday Honours, a Companion of the Order of the Bath in the 1986 New Year Honours, a knight bachelor in the 1990 New Year Honours, and a Knight of the Order of St John in 1986.

Military offices
Preceded by Robert Pascoe	Assistant Chief of the General Staff; 1983–1984	Succeeded by John MacMillan
Government offices
Preceded by Sir Nigel Cecil	Lieutenant Governor of the Isle of Man; 1985–1990	Succeeded by Sir Laurence Jones
Other offices
Unknown	President of the Soldiers' and Airmen's Scripture Readers Association; 1985-1999	Succeeded by Lord Dannatt
