= Margaret Inequane =

Manx woman who was executed for witchcraft

Margaret Inequane (also recorded as Ine Quane, Ine Quayne, or Ine Quain; d. 1617) was a Manx woman who was executed for witchcraft, alongside her son. They are the only two people confirmed to have been executed as witches on the Isle of Man.

== Biography ==
Inequane lived in Castletown, Isle of Man with her son, John Cubon. Their ages and further biographical details are missing from the historical record.

At the time of Inequane's trial, suspected witches in the Isle of Man were referred to a lay jury convened by a local parish. Known as a chapter quest, these juries were empowered to investigate "all offences committed against... spiritual laws." If a chapter quest believed an allegation had merit, the Anglican Bishop of Sodor and Man could send the case to the secular courts, which had the power to pass death sentences.

Both Inequane and Cubon were tried for witchcraft, though no extant records survive that explain why the pair were accused to begin with. Local lore provides that Inequane was discovered in the act of conducting a ritual to improve the fertility of her crops. It is likely that Cubon was executed solely for being Inequane's child, as children were sometimes killed alongside their parents for possessing "witch blood". The secular court sentenced Inequane to be "brought by the Coroner of Glenfaba to the place of execution, there to be burned till life depart from her body." Her son was sentenced to the same fate.

Inequane and Cubon were burnt at the stake by a market cross, the site of which today hosts the Smelt Monument. Their deaths unsettled the island's public, as well as its secular and spiritual authorities. Nearly all subsequent Manx witchcraft cases were handled by the ecclesiastical courts, which could only enforce a term of imprisonment as a maximum sentence.

== Legacy ==
The Smelt Monument bears a memorial plaque for Inequane and her son.

Their case was portrayed in the 2013 film Solace in Wicca, which also bears the distinction of being the first short film ever produced in Manx Gaelic.
