= Douglas Macfadyen =

Royal Air Force Air Marshal (1902–1968)

Sir Douglas Macfadyen
- Born: 8 August 1902
- Died: 26 July 1968 (aged 65)
- Relatives: Air Marshal Sir Ian Macfadyen (son)
- Military career
- Allegiance: United Kingdom
- Branch: Royal Air Force
- Service years: 1920–59
- Rank: Air Marshal
- Commands: Home Command (1956–59); RAF Staff College, Bracknell (1953–56); British Forces Aden (1952–53); RAF Mildenhall (1942); No. 105 Squadron (1939–40)
- Conflicts: Second World War
- Awards: Knight Commander of the Order of the Bath; Commander of the Order of the British Empire; Mentioned in Despatches (2)

Air Marshal Sir Douglas Macfadyen, KCB, CBE (8 August 1902 – 26 July 1968) was a Royal Air Force officer who became Air Officer Commanding-in-Chief at RAF Home Command from 1956 until his retirement in 1959.

== RAF career ==
After education at the Royal Grammar School, Newcastle, Macfadyen joined the Royal Air Force as a cadet in 1920. After a tour as Adjutant of the London University Air Squadron, he became Officer Commanding No. 105 Squadron in May 1939 and served in the Second World War in that role before joining the Planning Staff at Headquarters British Air Forces in France. He continued his war service at the Directorate of War Organisation, at Headquarters Eastern Air Command and at Headquarters North-West African Air Forces before being made Director of Policy (Air Staff) at the Air Ministry in 1944.

After the war he became Commandant of the Officer's Advanced Training School at RAF Digby and then at RAF Hornchurch. He was appointed Director of Plans at the Air Ministry in January 1949, Assistant Chief of the Air Staff (Policy) in August 1949 and Air Officer commanding British Forces Aden in 1952. He went on to be Commandant of the RAF Staff College, Bracknell, in 1953 and Air Officer Commanding-in-Chief at RAF Home Command in 1956 before retiring in 1959.

== Family ==
His son, Sir Ian Macfadyen, also became an air marshal.

== Cricket ==
In 1929 and 1931, Macfadyen played cricket for the Royal Air Force cricket team in inter-services matches against the British Army cricket team that were recognised as being of first-class cricket status. He had little success as a lower-order batsman in either match, but took two wickets as an opening bowler in the 1931 game. In 1920, he had played a single match in the Minor Counties Championship for Northumberland.

Military offices
Preceded by Francis Fressanges	Air Officer Commanding British Forces Aden; 1952–1953	Succeeded by Sidney Osborne Bufton
Preceded by Peter Gillmore	Commandant of the RAF Staff College, Bracknell; 1953–1956	Succeeded by Denis Barnett
Preceded by Sir Harold Lydford	Air Officer Commanding-in-Chief Home Command; 1956–1959	Succeeded by Post disbanded
