= Arthur Henniker-Major =

British Army general

Major-General The Honourable Arthur Henniker-Major CB
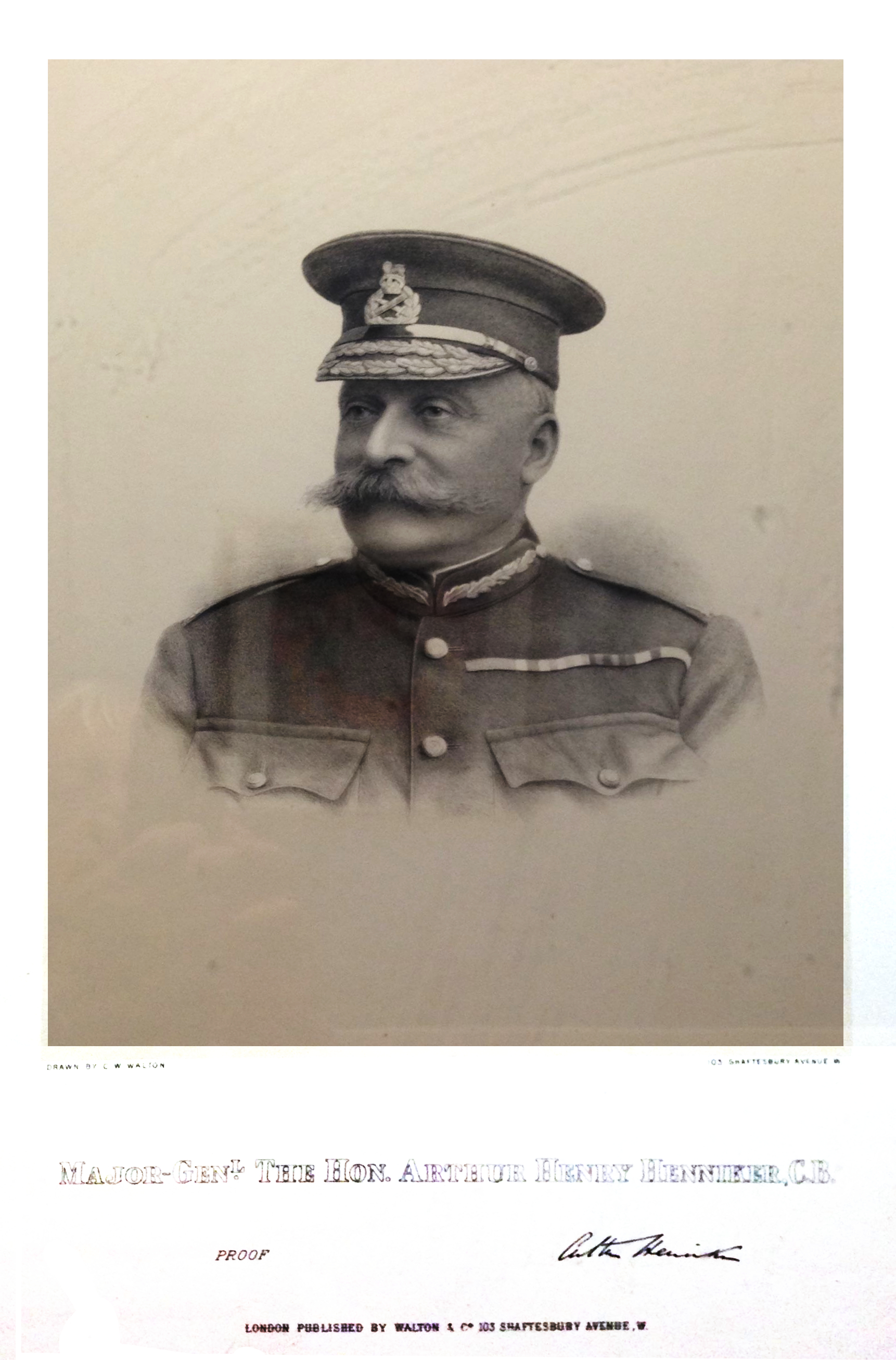
- Born: 3 April 1855
- Died: 6 February 1912 (aged 56)
- Military career
- Allegiance: United Kingdom
- Branch: British Army
- Rank: Major-General
- Commands: 2nd Bn, Coldstream Guards; 5th Guards Brigade; 1st Guards Brigade; 1st London Division
- Conflicts: Second Boer War
- Awards: Companion of the Order of the Bath

Major-General Arthur Henry Henniker-Major CB (3 April 1855 – 6 February 1912) was a British Army officer.

== Military career ==
Born the son of John Henniker-Major, 4th Baron Henniker, Henniker-Major was transferred from the West Suffolk Militia into the Coldstream Guards on 20 November 1875. He became commanding officer of the 2nd Battalion, the Coldstream Guards in 1899 and, after seeing action in South Africa during the Second Boer War, he became Brigadier-General in charge of Administration at Irish Command in 1904, commander of the 5th Guards Brigade at Aldershot Command in May 1907 and commander of 1st Guards Brigade at Aldershot Command in May 1908. Promoted in August 1909 to major general, he went on to be general officer commanding 1st London Division in December before his death in February 1912.

Military offices
Preceded by Alfred Codrington	GOC 1st London Division; 1909–1912	Succeeded by William Fry
