= Ian Jenkins (Royal Navy officer) =

Royal Navy admiral

Surgeon Vice-Admiral Ian Jenkins CB CVO
- Born: 12 September 1944; Cardiff
- Died: 19 February 2009 (aged 64); Windsor
- Military career
- Allegiance: United Kingdom
- Branch: Royal Navy
- Service years: 1973 - 2006
- Rank: Surgeon Vice Admiral
- Awards: Companion of the Order of the Bath; Commander of the Royal Victorian Order
- Other work: Constable and Governor of Windsor Castle

Surgeon Vice-Admiral Ian Lawrence Jenkins CB CVO (12 September 1944 – 19 February 2009) was a Royal Navy medical officer and former Surgeon General of the British Armed Forces.

== Career ==
Ian Jenkins was born in Cardiff and graduated from the Welsh National School of Medicine in 1968. He became a Fellow of The Royal College of Surgeons of England in 1973, and a consultant urologist in 1979.

He joined the Royal Naval Reserve in 1973 and transferred to the regular Royal Navy in 1975. His service included HMS Ark Royal, Royal Naval Hospital Haslar and Royal Naval Hospital Gibraltar, the Royal Marine Surgical Support Team and HMY Britannia.

During his career his clinical and research interests included the management of testicular cancer in the Royal Navy, professional medical education and the development of the Defence Medical Services.

He was appointed Professor of Naval Surgery in 1988–1991 when he became the Medical Officer in Command of RNH Haslar. In 1996 he became the first Defence Postgraduate Medical Dean and Commandant of the new Royal Defence Medical College. In 1999 he was promoted Surgeon Rear-Admiral and appointed the Medical Director General (Naval) working in Portsmouth.

In October 2002 he became the Surgeon General of Her Majesty's Armed Forces responsible to the Chief of the Defence Staff and the Secretary of State for Defence. Surgeon Vice Admiral Jenkins was appointed an Honorary Surgeon to Her Majesty the Queen in October 1994, a Companion of the Venerable Order of Saint John and a Commander of the Royal Victorian Order in 1999 for services to the Prince of Wales and a Companion of the Order of the Bath in 2006.

Ian Jenkins retired as the Surgeon General at the end of October 2006 and from the Royal Navy in January 2007.

== Later work ==
Jenkins was appointed Constable and Governor of Windsor Castle from 1 February 2008. He was Chairman of Seafarers UK and a Patron of Children and Families of the Far East Prisoners. He died on 19 February 2009.

== Honours and awards ==

Companion of the Order of the Bath (CB)	2006
Commander of the Royal Victorian Order (CVO)	2000
Companion of the Order of St John	
Queen Elizabeth II Golden Jubilee Medal	2002

Military offices
Preceded by Robert Menzies	Surgeon General of the British Armed Forces; 2002–2006	Succeeded by Louis Lillywhite
Honorary titles
Preceded by Richard Johns	Constable and Governor of Windsor Castle; 2008–2009	Succeeded by Ian Macfadyen
