= List of colonial governors and administrators of British Honduras =

Governor of British Honduras
- Flag of the governor of British Honduras (1884–1981)
- Longest serving Robert Hodgson Sr. 1749 – 1758
- Member of: Legislative Council
- Residence: Government House, Belize City
- Appointer: British Monarch
- Formation: 1749
- First holder: Robert Hodgson Sr.
- Final holder: Sir James Hennessy
- Abolished: 21 September 1981
- Succession: Governor-General of Belize

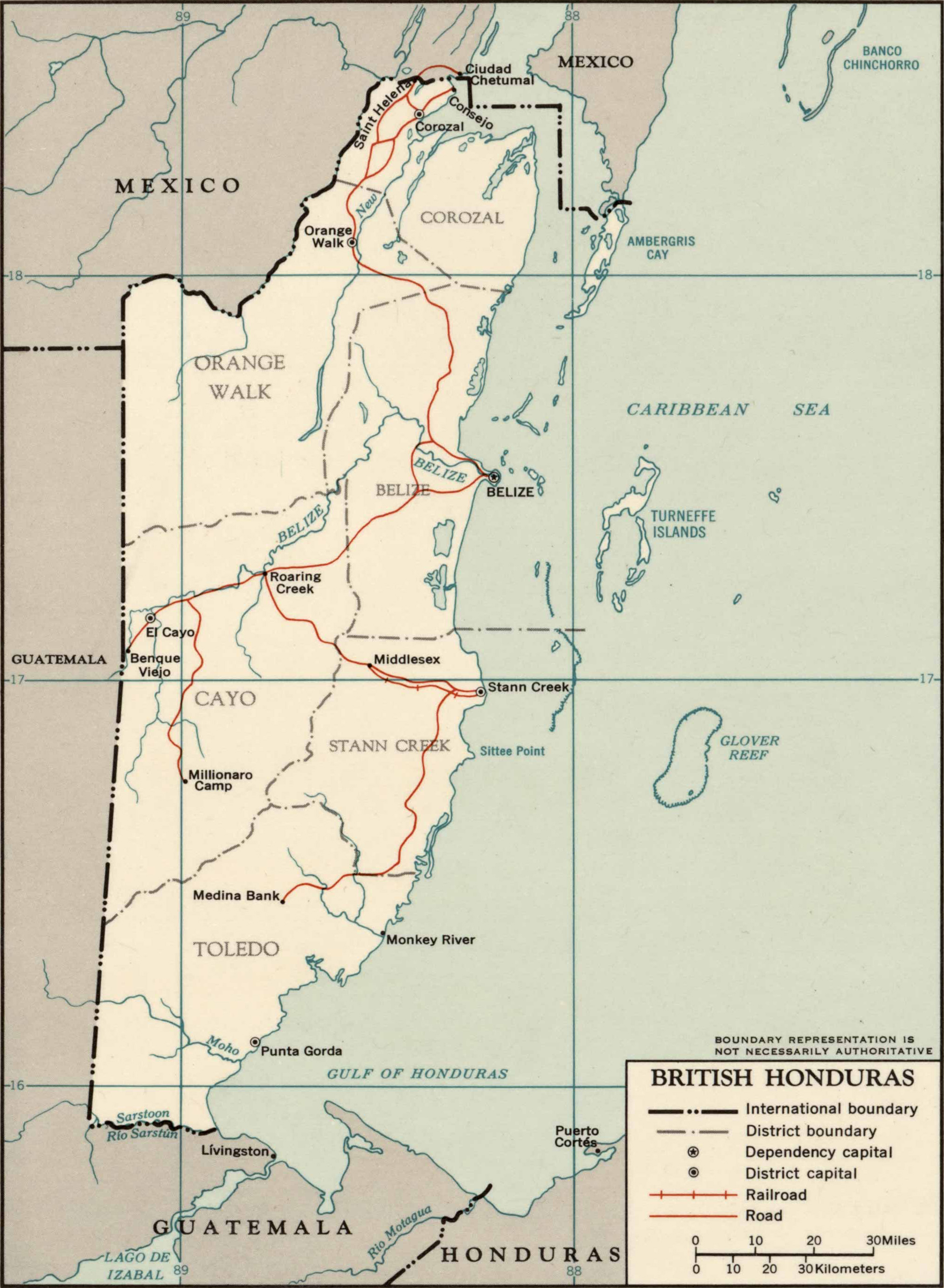
British Honduras map.

This is a list of viceroys in British Honduras and Belize from the start of British settlement in the area until the colony's independence in 1981. Until 1862, the territory was under the vice-regency of the Governor of Jamaica, and administered by a Superintendent. After this it was a colony in its own right, and administered by a Lieutenant Governor, still subordinate to Jamaica. In 1884, the colony gained its own governor, independent of Jamaica.

In 1973 the colony's name was changed to Belize and in 1981 it gained independence. For a list of viceroys after independence, see Governor-General of Belize.

== List of officeholders ==
Tenure	Portrait	Incumbent	Notes
Superintendents of British Honduras (1749–1862)
1749–1758		Robert Hodgson Sr.	
1758–1760		Richard Jones	
1760–1767		Joseph Otway	
1767–1775		Robert Hodgson Jr.	
1776		John Ferguson	
1776 – 10 March 1787		James Lawrie	
1787 – June 1790		Edward Despard	
June 1790 – March 1791		Lt Gen Peter Hunter	Acting
March 1791 – January 1797		Thomas Potts	Chief magistrate
January 1797 – August 1800		Thomas Barrow	First time
August 1800 – October 1802		Sir Richard Basset	
January 1803 – February 1805		Thomas Barrow	Second time
September 1805 – April 1806		Gabriel Gordon	
April 1806 – September 1809		Alexander Mark Kerr Hamilton	
September 1809 – July 1814		John Nugent Smyth	
July 1814 – April 1822		Sir George Arthur	
1822–1823		Allan Hampden Pye	
1823–1829		Edward Codd	
1829–1830		Alexander MacDonald	First time
1830–1837		Sir Francis Cockburn	
1837–1843		Alexander MacDonald	Second time
1843–1851		Charles St. John Fancourt	
1851–1854		Sir Philip Wodehouse	
1854–1857		Sir William Stevenson	
1857–1862		Frederick Seymour	
Lieutenant Governors of British Honduras (1862–1884) (Note: In 1862, the territory became a crown colony, and was subsequently administered by a Lieutenant Governor, subordinate to the Governor of Jamaica.)
1862–1864		Frederick Seymour	Continued
1864–1867		John Gardiner Austin	
1867–1870		Sir James Robert Longden	
1870–1874		Sir William Wellington Cairns	
1874–1877		Sir Robert Miller Mundy	
1877–1883		Sir Frederick Palgrave Barlee	
13 May 1883 – 1884		Col Sir Robert William Harley	
Governors of British Honduras (1884–1973) (Note: In 1884, the colony was severed from its dependency to Jamaica and gained its own Governor.)
1884–1891		Sir Roger Tuckfield Goldsworthy	
1891–1897		Sir Cornelius Alfred Moloney	
1897–1904		Sir David Wilson	
15 April 1904 – 1906		Sir Ernest Bickham Sweet-Escott	
13 August 1906 – 9 May 1913		Sir Eric John Eagles Swayne	
19 May 1913 – January 1918		Sir Wilfred Collet	
29 January 1918 – 4 September 1918		William Hart-Bennett	
22 March 1919 – 1925		Sir Eyre Hutson	
16 April 1925 – 1932		Sir John Alder Burdon	
9 March 1932 – 1934		Sir Harold Baxter Kittermaster	
2 November 1934 – 1939		Sir Alan Cuthbert Maxwell Burns	
24 February 1940 – 1 July 1946		Sir John Adams Hunter	
1 July 1946 – 14 January 1947		Sir Arthur Norman Wolffsohn	Acting
14 January 1947 – 1948		Sir Edward Gerald Hawkesworth	
28 February 1949 – 1952		Sir Ronald Herbert Garvey	
21 October 1952 – 1955		Sir Patrick Muir Renison	
17 January 1956 – 1961		Sir Colin Hardwick Thornley	
9 December 1961 – 1966		Sir Peter Hyla Gawne Stallard	
11 July 1966 – January 1972		Sir John Warburton Paul	
26 January 1972 – 31 May 1973		Sir Richard Neil Posnett	
Governors of Belize (1973–1981) (Note: On 1 June 1973, the colony of British Honduras was renamed Belize.)
1 June 1973 – 1976		Sir Richard Neil Posnett	Continued
1 June 1976 – 1980		Peter Donovan McEntee	
1980 – 21 September 1981		Sir James Hennessy	

On 21 September 1981 Belize gained independence from the United Kingdom. For viceroys of Belize after independence, see Governor-General of Belize.

== See also ==
- List of heads of state of Belize
- List of prime ministers of Belize
