= Solace in Wicca =

- Online Release Poster
- Directed by: Andy North
- Written by: Nathan Russell-Raby
- Produced by: Nathan Russell-Raby; Andy North
- Starring: Joanna Taylor; Steve Craige; Wayne Kelsall
- Cinematography: Daniyel Lowden
- Edited by: Jim Hampton
- Music by: Andy North
- Production company: CinemaNX, Isle of Man Film
- Distributed by: Culture Vannin
- Release dates: 15 September 2013 (Villa Marina, Isle of Man); 23 November 2017 (International Home Media)
- Running time: 9 minutes
- Country: Isle of Man
- Language: Manx Gaelic

Solace in Wicca is a 2013 Manx-produced short biographical horror drama film about the 1617 execution of Margaret Quaine and her son Robert, the only executions for witchcraft recorded on the Isle of Man and one of the last witchcraft executions to be sanctioned by the Church of England in the British Isles.

The short film was the first production to be shot entirely in Manx Gaelic, and was financed by Culture Vannin, CinemaNX and Isle of Man Film. It premiered at the Isle of Man Film Festival in September 2013 and was distributed online in November 2017 by Culture Vannin.

== Production ==
The screenplay was one of thirty-two screenplays submitted to the MannIN Shorts Screenplay Contest in January 2011 and was selected as one of three screenplays eligible for a production-budget as part of the MannIN Shorts scheme.

Andy North, lecturer of film and digital media at the Isle of Man College and Chester University, was hired to direct the short film and helped developed the screenplay throughout a six-month period of pre-production. North decided to translate the screenplay's dialogue into the period-accurate Manx Gaelic Language, a decision which attracted the financial support of Culture Vannin.

The opportunity to support emerging talent excited the Isle of Man Government's film investment partner CinemaNX, who co-financed the production with a view to acquiring the rights to an English-language commercial remake. CinemaNX's successor Pinewood Studios optioned the rights and developed the commercial remake as a Halloween origins story in 2013.

Principal photography took place over a five-day period in July 2012, at national heritage sites Castle Rushen, Cregneash Village, and the Niarbyl Fault. Manx National Heritage donated use of their sites without charging a location fee, due to the historical nature of the piece.

Experienced non-Manx-speaking actors were cast in the lead roles, and learned their Manx dialogue parrot fashion via a CD recorded by a dialect and language coach. Fluent Manx speakers were cast in minor roles.
