= Ian Macfadyen =

RAF Air Marshal (born 1942)

Air Marshal Sir Ian Macfadyen KCVO CB OBE

27th Lieutenant Governor of the Isle of Man
- In office 25 October 2000 – 1 February 2005
- Monarch: Elizabeth II
- Preceded by: Sir Timothy Daunt
- Succeeded by: Sir Paul Haddacks

Personal details
- Born: Ian David Macfadyen; 19 February 1942 (age 84)
- Spouse: Sally Macfadyen
- Children: Simon Macfadyen, Kate Comaish
- Parent: Douglas Macfadyen (father)
- Relatives: Mary (Mollie) Macfadyen; Margret (Maggie) Macfadyen; Matilda (Tillie) Macfadyen; Alex Comaish; William (Will) Comaish; Oliver (Ollie) Comaish; (all grandchildren)
- Education: Marlborough College
- Occupation: Retired

Military service
- Allegiance: United Kingdom
- Branch/service: Royal Air Force
- Years of service: 1960–99
- Rank: Air Marshal
- Commands: British Forces Middle East; RAF Leuchars; No. 23 Squadron; No. 29 Squadron
- Battles/wars: Falklands War; Gulf War
- Awards: Knight Commander of the Royal Victorian Order; Companion of the Order of the Bath; Officer of the Order of the British Empire; Queen's Commendation for Valuable Service in the Air
Viceregal styles of Ian Macfadyen (2000-2005)
- Reference style: His Excellency
- Spoken style: Your Excellency

Sir Ian David Macfadyen, KCVO, CB, OBE, FRAeS (born 19 February 1942) is a senior Royal Air Force officer, a former Lieutenant Governor of the Isle of Man (2000–05) and Constable and Governor of Windsor Castle (2009–14).

== RAF career ==
Born the son of Air Marshal Sir Douglas Macfadyen, Ian Macfadyen was educated at Marlborough College and entered the RAF College Cranwell in 1960. Like his father, he graduated with the Sword of Honour.

After service on 19 Squadron in the UK and RAF Germany flying the Lightning, in 1970 he became a flying instructor and a member of the Poachers formation aerobatic team at the Royal Air Force College Cranwell.

In 1980 as a wing commander he was appointed Officer Commanding of No. 29 Squadron flying F4 Phantom aircraft at RAF Coningsby with whom he saw operational service in the Falkland Islands, and Officer Commanding of No. 23 Squadron in 1983.

In 1985 as a group captain he was Station Commander at RAF Leuchars in Fife He was at the Royal College of Defence Studies in 1988. In late 1990 he became the Chief of Staff, Headquarters British Forces Middle East and later became the Commander of British Forces. From 1991 as an Air Vice-Marshal he was Assistant Chief of the Defence Staff, Operational Requirements (Air Systems) – ACAS OR (Air).

In 1994 he was promoted to Air Marshal and became Director General of the Saudi Arabia Armed Forces Project in Riyadh.

He retired from the RAF in February 1999.

== Later life ==
In October 2000 Macfadyen was appointed Lieutenant Governor of the Isle of Man.

From 2006 to 2008 he was the National President of the Royal British Legion and later the Honorary Inspector General of the Royal Auxiliary Air Force.

In October 2009 Macfadyen became Constable and Governor of Windsor Castle in succession to Vice Admiral Ian Jenkins. Before retirement from this post in July 2014, Macfadyen was knighted by the Queen as a Knight Commander of the Royal Victorian Order in a private ceremony in Windsor Castle.

Military offices
Preceded by Peter de la Billière	Commander British Forces Middle East; In-theatre commander for Operation Granby; 1991	Gulf War ended
Government offices
Preceded by Sir Timothy Daunt	Lieutenant Governor of the Isle of Man; 2000–2005	Succeeded by Mike Kerruish
Honorary titles
Preceded by Ian Jenkins	Constable and Governor of Windsor Castle; 2009–2014	Succeeded by Sir James Perowne
Non-profit organization positions
Preceded by The Earl of Effingham	President of the Royal British Legion; 2006–2008	Succeeded by John Kiszely
