= Amelia Jane Murray =

Artist known for depictions of fairies

Amelia Jane Murray (1800–1896) or Lady Oswald, was a Victorian fairy artist from the Isle of Man. Her watercolor paintings depicted fairies and flowers and were inspired by the folklore of the island. She was the daughter of Lord Henry Murray and the niece of John Murray who was the 4th Duke of Atholl.

== Biography ==
Amelia Jane Murray was born in Port-e-Chee, which means 'Fairy Music' in Manx Gaelic. Growing up, Murray lived in Mount Murray, her family's home which was five miles from Douglas.

Murray's fairy paintings were inspired by the rich folklore of the Isle of Man and many of them had embossed borders. They date to the early 1820s and the watercolor pictures suggest that Murray had significant knowledge of the flora and fauna. They are often based on Manx folklore and depict delicate fairies in the natural beauty of the landscape.

In 1829, she married Sir John Oswald of Dunniker, who was twenty-nine years older than she. They moved to Fife, Scotland where she looked after his six children from his previous marriage, as well as their own two.

Murray's paintings of fairies were later published for the first time in 1985, in a book called, A Regency Lady’s Fairy Bower.
