= Gerald Hawkesworth =

British colonial administrator (1897-1949)

Sir Edward Gerald Hawkesworth, KCMG, MC (1897–14 August 1949) was a British colonial administrator. He was Governor of British Honduras from 1947 to 1948.
