= Garry L. Parks =

American Marine Corps general (born 1947)

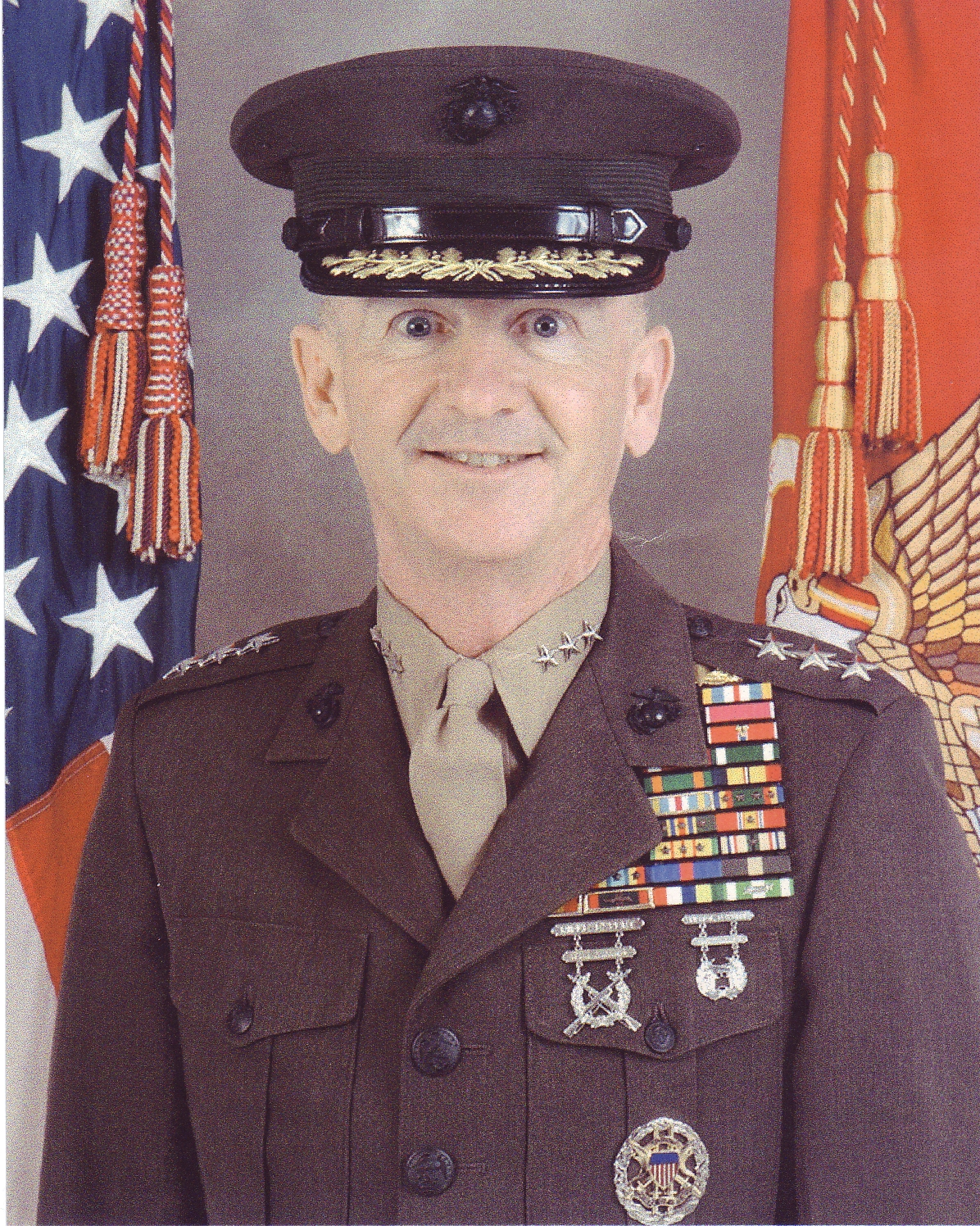
- Born: March 9, 1947 (age 79); Huntingdon, Pennsylvania
- Allegiance: United States
- Branch: United States Marine Corps
- Service years: 1969 – 2004
- Rank: Lieutenant General
- Commands: Marine Corps Recruiting Command; Marine Corps Recruit Depot San Diego; 9th Marine Regiment; 2d Battalion, 5th Marines
- Conflicts: Vietnam War
- Awards: Distinguished Service Medal; Legion of Merit; Bronze Star Medal with combat V
- Other work: Corporate CEO and consultant

Garry L. Parks (born March 9, 1947) is a corporate executive and retired United States Marine Corps Lieutenant General whose 35-year career included service as Deputy Commandant for Manpower and Reserve Affairs, Commanding General of the Marine Corps Recruiting Command and Commanding General of Marine Corps Recruit Depot San Diego.

== Career ==
A native of Huntingdon, Pennsylvania, he graduated from The Citadel in 1969 with a bachelor's degree in Education and served as Commander of the Regimental Band, he was commissioned as an Infantry Officer via Officer Candidates School. He served as a Platoon Leader and Company Executive Officer with the 1st Reconnaissance Battalion in South Vietnam, Company Commander with the 3d and 9th Marine Regiments and as a Recruit Company Commander at Marine Corps Recruit Depot Parris Island. His other command assignments have included 2d Battalion, 5th Marines and the 9th Marine Regiment; he served as Chief of Staff for United States Marine Corps Forces, Pacific and as deputy director, Politico and Military Affairs (J-5) on the Joint Staff at the Pentagon.

General Parks is a graduate of the U.S. Army Infantry Officer Advanced Course; he earned a master's degree in education from Pepperdine University and a master's degree in National Security and Strategic Studies from the Naval War College. He is an Honors Graduate from Command and Staff College of the Marine Corps University and has attended senior executive leadership courses at the John F. Kennedy School of Government Harvard University, The Citadel, the Naval Postgraduate School, Syracuse University and Johns Hopkins University. His military awards include the Distinguished Service Medal, Legion of Merit and Bronze Star Medal with combat V device.

Since retirement he has served in numerous corporate positions and with various civic organizations and advisory committees; he was president and chief executive officer for the South Carolina Credit Union League and Affiliates, CEO for Efficient Energy Advisors in Seabrook, South Carolina and from 2011 to 2016 was chairman of the board of directors for Armed Forces Insurance. He has also been on the board of directors for Navy Federal Credit Union and has been a consultant with Booz Allen Hamilton, BCP International and Burdeshaw Associates as well as an advisor with Suntiva Executive Coaching. Civic involvement has included the Beaufort Regional Chamber of Commerce, South Carolina Military Base Task Force and the Medal of Honor Society.
