= Peter Donovan McEntee =

British colonial administrator and diplomat (1920-2002)

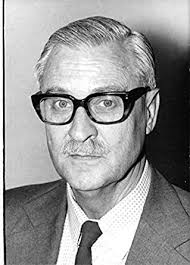

Peter Donovan McEntee, CMG, OBE (27 June 1920 – 30 July 2002) was a British colonial administrator and diplomat. He was Governor of Belize from 1976 to 1980.

Peter was born in Bournemouth and emigrated to Kenya with his parents when he was about a year old. He began his education at Pembroke House School at Gilgil in Kenya. He then returned to England for his higher education at Haileybury and served during the Second World War in the King's African Rifles (Major) in Kenya, Abyssinia, Madagascar, and Burma. After the war, he ran the Company Commander's wing of the Combined School of Infantry in Nakuru, Kenya. He served in Kenya as a district officer, in Embu from 1946, then as district commissioner in Kapenguria and Marsabit, as Municipal African Affairs Officer, in Mombasa, as Assistant Secretary at the Chief Secretary's Office, Nairobi, as Replacement Officer in Nakuru and Thika Districts and in Thompsons Falls. He then returned to the Secretariat in Nairobi and finally took control of Central Nyanza District as Provincial Commissioner, being headquartered in Kisumu. He was then made African Courts Officer at the High Court in Nairobi, where he worked on integrating the elements of traditional Kenyan tribal law into the statute books that would be implemented in post-independent Kenya, from 1960-1963. His last job in Kenya was as the Principal of the Jean School of Administration, at Kabete a suburb of Nairobi. Jean School was established to train young Kenyans for positions within government as Kenya prepared for its change to self-government.

Peter left Kenya in late 1963 and joined the Foreign and Commonwealth Office (FCO) in Whitehall. He was soon transferred to Lagos, Nigeria, where he served as First Secretary (Internal), from 1964-1967. Returning to London, he worked from 1967 to 1972 as a desk officer at the Foreign and Commonwealth Office and an assistant at the Commonwealth Relations Department. He was then made Consul General, Karachi, Pakistan, 1972-1975. His final position before retirement was as Governor and Commander-in-Chief, Belize, 1976-1980.

After his retirement, he served as Vice-Chairman of the Royal Commonwealth Society for the Blind, and, from 1993, Chairman of the Council of the Royal Overseas League.

In 1945 he married Mary Elisabeth Sherwood, with whom he had two daughters, Carol and Bridget.
