= Trade unions in the Isle of Man =

- National organization(s): Isle of Man Trades Union Council

International Labour Organization
- Isle of Man has separate territorial status but is an ILO member via the United Kingdom

Convention declaration
- Freedom of Association: 27 June 1949
- Right to Organise: 30 June 1950

Trade unions in the Isle of Man date from the emergence of the first trade unions in Great Britain in the early to mid-19th Century. Initially influenced by the Chartist movement, Manx trade unions played important roles in campaigns for universal suffrage and improvement in working conditions. During the period immediately after the First World War, the Isle of Man saw significant industrial conflict and the labour movement in the island emerged as one of the strongest throughout the British Isles.

== Beginnings to World War One ==
Congress of Spinners of the British Isles in 1829.

In 1829/30 cotton During the Chartist period, there were far fewer restrictions on freedom of speech in the Isle of Man and Chartist organisations used Douglas as a base for publications.

Bakers were unionised in 1908, and post office staff in 1912.

== General strike and reform ==
Living conditions in the Isle of Man for the general population deteriorated during the War - in 1917 costs were 80% above 1914 levels with no wage rises to compensate.

== Unions today ==
The Isle of Man Trades Union Council (IOMTUC) operates as the peak body with 10 affiliated unions: Unite, UNISON, USDAW, NUT, RCN, CWU, NHAT, BECTU, BDA and ATL.
