= Edward Smith (governor) =

Governor of the Isle of Man

Edward Smith (fl. 1777) was a governor of the Isle of Man. He was an army officer with the rank of Colonel, appointed in 1777. He ordered a census by parish in 1784.
