= Cecil Park (British Army officer) =

British Army general

Major-General Cecil Park CB
- Born: 19 June 1856
- Died: 29 March 1913 (aged 56)
- Military career
- Allegiance: United Kingdom
- Branch: British Army
- Rank: Major-General
- Commands: 1st Bn the Devonshire Regiment; Nasirabad Brigade; East Lancashire Division
- Conflicts: Second Anglo-Afghan War; Second Boer War
- Awards: Companion of the Order of the Bath

Major-General Cecil William Park CB (19 June 1856– 29 March 1913) was a British Army officer.

== Military career ==
Educated at Haileybury, Park was commissioned into the British Army in 1875. After seeing action in the Second Anglo-Afghan War in 1879, he became commanding officer of the 1st Battalion the Devonshire Regiment and was deployed to South Africa in 1899 during the Second Boer War. His battalion's charge on the boers on Waggon Hill on 6 January 1900 during the Relief of Ladysmith was described as "the crowning episode of the day".

He became assistant adjutant-general for South Eastern District in 1902, deputy adjutant general in India on 28 July 1903 and commandant of the Nasirabad Brigade in January 1906. In June he was made a Companion of the Order of the Bath (CB) in the 1906 Birthday Honours. He was promoted to major general in October 1907.

His last post was as General Officer Commanding East Lancashire Division in October 1910 before his death in command of his division on 29 March 1913.

== Sources ==
- Macdonald, Donald (1900). How We Kept the Flag Flying: The Story of the Siege of Ladysmith. Ward, Lock and Co.
- Spiers, Edward (2010). Letters from Ladysmith: Eyewitness Accounts from the South African War. Frontline Books. ISBN 978-1848325944.

Military offices
Preceded by William Fry	GOC East Lancashire Division; 1910–1913	Succeeded by William Douglas
