= Lieutenant Governor of the Isle of Man =

Representative of the British monarch in Isle of Man

Coordinates: 54.173°N 4.466°W

- Fo-chiannoort Vannin; Lhiass-chiannoort Vannin
- Standard of the Lieutenant Governor

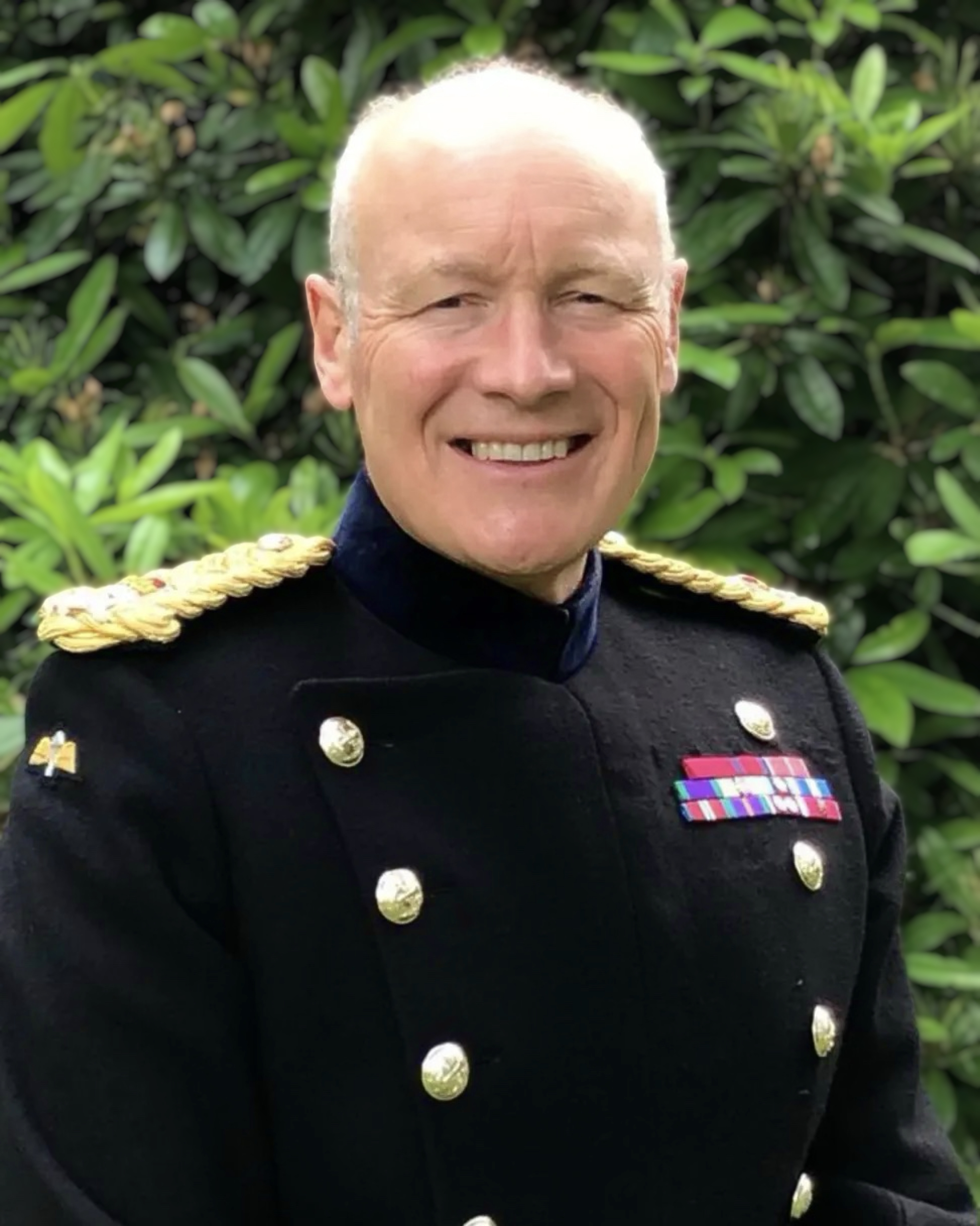
- Incumbent; Sir John Lorimer since 29 September 2021
- Lieutenant Governor
- Style: His Excellency
- Reports to: Lord of Mann
- Residence: Government House, Isle of Man
- Nominator: Isle of Man Government
- Appointer: Lord of Mann
- Term length: 5 years
- Formation: 1773
- First holder: Henry Hope
- Deputy: First Deemster Andrew Corlett
- Salary: £108,208
- Website: Government House, Isle of Man

The lieutenant governor of the Isle of Man (Manx: Fo-chiannoort Vannin or lhiass-chiannoort vannin) is the Lord of Mann's official personal representative in the Isle of Man. He has the power to grant royal assent and is styled "His Excellency".

No Manx-born person has ever been appointed lieutenant governor, although Manx-born first deemsters (ex officio deputy governors) have taken on the role temporarily during an interregnum between governors, and during periods when the lieutenant governor is off-island.

The official residence of the governor is Government House, Governor's Road, Onchan.

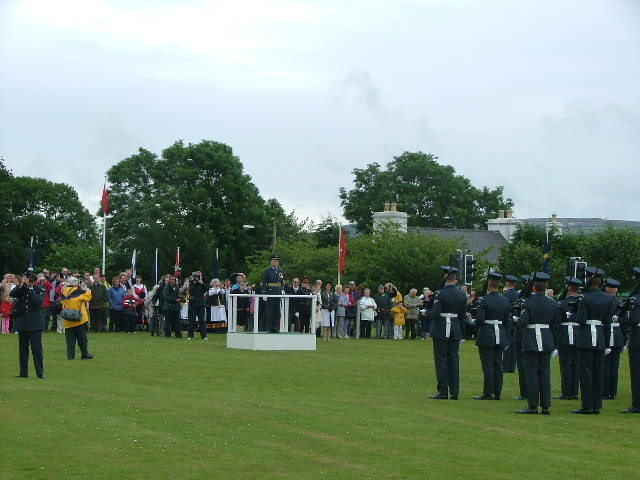
Lieutenant Governor's Speech, Tynwald Day.

In the past, the lieutenant governor wielded considerable judicial, fiscal and executive power on the island. However, the office lost his prerogatives as head of the judiciary in 1921, as head of government in 1961, as president of the Legislative Council in 1980 and finally as president of Tynwald in 1990. Today the role of lieutenant governor is essentially ceremonial, although certain powers under Isle of Man legislation do still fall to the governor or governor-in-council (a decision on the advice, and with the approval of, the Council of Ministers).

== History ==
In 1877, the eminent Manx advocate James Gell, considered the issue of the proper title of the chief executive of the island, and whether there were any words in the commissions of the lieutenant governors which suspended their functions during the presence in the island of the lord of Mann or a governor of the Isle of Man. Gell referred to a search he undertook at the Rolls Office, the results of which are included in a list of 83 appointments of governors between 1595 and 1863. Not all appointments during that period are listed in this article as it was difficult to trace appointments prior to 1639; at about that time the practice began of keeping a distinct book for the enrolment of commissions. In addition, after that date certain commissions were also omitted to be enrolled. For instance, no record of the appointment of the 4th Duke of Atholl as governor in 1793 could be traced.

Historically the designations "governor", "lieutenant" (that is, the king's or queen's or lord of Mann's lieutenant) and "captain" were synonymous. Only one reference to deputy lieutenant is made, that of Governor Horton's appointment in 1725. In some commissions expressions designating the office, such as governor; captain general and commander-in-chief; chief governor and commander-in-chief; chief governor; and governor-in-chief and captain general; may well imply the conferring of powers, civil and military, though the designation given may possibly affect the rank of the person appointed, as between himself and others holding similar or analogous appointments.

If the sovereign intended not to bestow the full powers of a governor on a specific person, then the limitations had to be expressed on the face of the commission. However no record of such an amendment exists, and although any legal power exercised could not be questioned as to its legality by any subject, a governor as between himself and the Crown, would be controlled as to the exercise of his powers by his instructions and would therefore be accountable for any injudicious use of them.

A lieutenant governor or deputy governor having a commission with no express limitation to their powers, could perform all the functions of a governor while his powers were in force.

James Gell twice held the office of governor of the Isle of Man: first during the illness of Lord Henniker, Gell being appointed deputy and presiding at Tynwald; and second during the interregnum between Lord Henniker's death and the appointment of Lord Raglan.

Whilst Gell was appointed deputy governor on the first occasion, he was appointed acting governor in the second instance, an important distinction. The Dukes of Atholl were the last supreme governors of the Isle of Man, until the Isle of Man Purchase Act 1765, also known as the Act of Revestment. All governors since then had been lieutenant governors, but Gell's appointment as acting governor was on a par with the position of the Duke of Atholl, and he had the right to appoint a lieutenant governor had he so wished. So his office as acting governor carried with it greater authority than that of lieutenant governor; this fact Gell himself pointed out to the Home Office.

The term "lieutenant governor" was not used before the Act of Revestment in 1765; the term "deputy governor" was used instead. The appointments of Peter Legh (1596), Ratcliffe Gerrard (1639), Roger Nowell (1660), William Sacheverell (1692), Thomas Huddlestone (1700) and Alexander Horne (1713) as deputy governors can therefore be seen as temporary appointments during a vacancy.

Lieutenant governors and deputy governors could exercise the powers of a governor of the Isle of Man in one respect: they could appoint deputies. In the cases of Charles Stanley (1702) and Bishop Isaac Barrow (1774) this prerogative was specifically granted; however over time it became common custom amongst successive lieutenant governors. This would allow governors to appoint deputies for specific periods or purposes, such as during the governor's absence on specified occasions, or during his illness when not absent; the list below illustrates this and shows the great number of appointments made by governors of deputies during their absence. For instance the various appointments of Deemsters McYlrea and Taubman can be seen as examples of appointments for executing judicial functions.

Before the Act of Revestment, deputies were expressly appointed to act during absence, except in one case: that of Bishop Isaac Barrow in 1664. In this case, the deputy governor, Roger Nowell, acted whilst Governor Barrow was on the island, sometimes along with him and sometimes solely. This was an exceptional case; it was probably not intended that the Bishop have more to do with temporal affairs than was absolutely necessary.

After revestment, the appointments of lieutenant governors Henry Hope (1773), Richard Dawson (1775 and 1777), Alexander Shaw (1790), Henry Murray (1804) and Cornelius Smelt (1805) were also expressly held during the absence of the governors. The appointments of Lieutenant Governors John Ready (1832), Charles Hope (1845) and Francis Pigott Stainsby Conant (1860), say nothing as to the presence of a governor-in-chief, and these three persons were therefore appointed to be "merely" lieutenant governors. It may be the case with the appointment of Colonel Ready that it was not intended for him to take the office of governor-in-chief, and therefore no allusion was made in the commissions of the lieutenant governors to their office. However, it appears that without any words expressly suspending the functions of a lieutenant governor, they would as a matter of course be suspended.

== Appointment ==
Before 2010 the lieutenant governor was appointed by the Crown on the advice of a panel led by the government of the United Kingdom. In July 2010 the government of the Isle of Man announced that the next lieutenant governor would be appointed on the advice of an entirely local panel, comprising the chief minister, the president of Tynwald and the first deemster. The new procedure was used for the first time a few months later to choose Sir Paul Haddacks's successor.

== Proposed change to title ==
In October 2005 Tynwald sought to change the title of the lieutenant governor to Crown Commissioner. This proposal was sent to the British Department of Constitutional Affairs for submission to Queen Elizabeth II, Lord of Mann, for approval. However, in April 2006, after much public disapproval, Tynwald reversed its proposal and withdrew its request for royal assent. Thus the lieutenant governor's title remained unchanged.

== List of governors ==
List of governors
Date appointed	Appointee name	Appointed office	By whom appointed	Remarks
1 Aug 1595	Thomas Garret (or Gerrard)	Captain	Queen Elizabeth I	Appointment pending the dispute as to the succession to the island in the House of Stanley.
3 Jul 1596	Peter Legh	Captain and governor	Lord Keeper and other offices of state for Queen Elizabeth	To act during the absence from the island of Thomas Garret.
30 Mar 1639	Ratcliffe Gerrard	Deputy governor	Lord of Mann (Lord Strange; later, 7th Earl of Derby)	To act during the absence from the island by Sir Charles Gerrard, governor.
20 Jul 1639	Ffoulks Hunckers	Captain and governor	Lord of Mann; 7th Earl of Derby	In place of Sir Charles Gerrard.
20 Jun 1640	John Greenhaigh	Captain and governor	Lord of Mann; 7th Earl of Derby	In place of Sir Ffoulks Hunckers.
12 Nov 1652	John Sharples	Deputy governor	Commissioners of Lord Fairfax, to whom the Isle of Man had been granted during the term of the Commonwealth of England	To be deputy governor as to the Civil Magistracie thereof. [This appointment confers limited powers and excluded military authority].
16 Jul 1660	Roger Nowell	Governor, captain-general and commander-in-chief	Lord of Mann (Charles, Earl of Derby)	Appointment following the restoration of the monarchy.
16 Jul 1660	Richard Stevenson	Deputy governor	Charles, Earl of Derby	To sit during the absence of Governor Roger Nowell.
11 Dec 1662	Henry Nowell	Deputy governor	Governor Roger Nowell	To act during the absence of the governor.
18 Sep 1663	Henry Nowell	Deputy governor	7th Earl of Derby	To act during pleasure, in place of Thomas Stanley.
31 May 1664	Isaac Barrow	Governor	Lord of Mann (Charles Stanley, 8th Earl of Derby)	To hold and exercise the said Office by himself, or by Henry Nowell, his deputy or some other sufficient person who he should think fit [This was looked upon as an exceptional appointment, for the Deputy Nowell acted sometimes alone, and sometimes along with the governor - Mills Statute p. 137].
28 Jul 1673	Henry Nowell	Governor	William, Earl of Derby (by his Guardian, Duke of Ormonde)	
10 Apr 1677	Henry Stanley	Governor	Lord of Mann (William Stanley, 9th Earl of Derby)	
13 Apr 1678	Robert Heywood	Governor	Lord of Mann (William Stanley, 9th Earl of Derby)	
16 Mar 1690/1	Roger Kenyon	Governor	Lord of Mann (William Stanley, 9th Earl of Derby)	
6 Apr 1692	William Sacheverell	Deputy governor	William, Earl of Derby	To take on him the whole government, during pleasure [probably governorship vacant].
10 Oct 1692	Richard Stevenson (Water Bailiff); John Rowe (Clerk of the Rolls)	Deputy governor	Deputy Governor Sacheverell	The appointment is stated on the face of it to be made by order of the Right Honourable the Lord of this Isle [This is quite remarkable. Deputies appointed by a deputy, but apparently made by special authority].
9 May 1693	William Sacheverell	Governor	Lord of Mann (William Stanley, 9th Earl of Derby)	
15 Jun 1695	Nicholas Sankey	Governor	Lord of Mann (William Stanley, 9th Earl of Derby)	
28 Jul 1696	John Rowe; Peter Heywood; Deemster John Parr	Deputy governor	Governor Sankey	To act jointly.
30 Oct 1700	Thomas Huddlestone	Deputy governor	Lord of Mann (William Stanley, 9th Earl of Derby)	To take upon him the whole government during pleasure. [This was probably a temporary appointment during a vacancy of governorship].
10 Mar 1700/01	James Cranstoun	Deputy governor	Lord of Mann (William Stanley, 9th Earl of Derby)	
21 Nov 1702	Charles Zedenno Stanley	Chief governor and commander-in-chief	Lord of Mann (James Stanley, 10th Earl of Derby)	To exercise office by himself, or his sufficient deputy or deputies, during pleasure.
3 Dec 1702	Robert Mawdesley	Deputy governor	Governor Stanley	During pleasure.
30 Oct 1702–03	Deemster John Parr	Deputy governor	Governor Stanley	During absence of Deputy Governor Mawdesley.
12 Jul 1703	John Rowe; Christopher Parker (Receiver General)	Deputy governor	Governor Stanley	To act during the absence of Deputy Governor Mawdesley, on the departure of Deputy Governor Parr, who had been called by the Lord of England on weighty business.
25 Nov 1703	Robert Mawdesley	Deputy governor	Lord of Mann (James Stanley, 10th Earl of Derby)	Confirmation of Mawdesley's previous appointment as deputy governor by Governor Stanley. [This confirmation seems to have amounted to an appointment as governor, which he styled himself afterwards].
17 Jul 1712	Deemster John Parr	Deputy governor	Governor Mawdesley	To act during the governor's absence in England.
20 May 1713	Deemster John Parr	Deputy governor	Governor Mawdesley	To act during governor's absence from the Isle of Man.
18 Jul 1713	Charles Zedenno Stanley; Alexander Horne	Chief governor & deputy governor	Lord of Mann (James Stanley, 10th Earl of Derby)	The deputy to act in the absence of the governor.
17 Oct 1713	John Rowe; William Sedden (Water Bailiff)	Deputy governor	Governor Stanley	To act jointly during the absence of Governor and Deputy Governor Horne.
13 Oct 1714	John Rowe; William Sedden (Water Bailiff)	Deputy governor	Deputy Governor Horne	To act during the absence of Deputy Governor Horne in England. (This is an appointment of deputies by a deputy.)
25 Jun 1718	John Rowe; William Sedden (Water Bailiff)	Deputy governor	Deputy Governor Horne	To act during Deputy Governor Horne's absence from the Isle of Man. [See above.]
9 Jul 1718	Capt. Alexander Horne	Governor & commander-in-chief	Lord of Mann (James Stanley, 10th Earl of Derby)	
27 Jun 1719	John Rowe; William Sedden (Water Bailiff)	Deputy governor	Governor Horne	To serve during Governor Horne's absence.
1 Jul 1719	John Rowe; William Sedden (Water Bailiff)	Deputy governor	Governor Horne	To serve during Governor Horne's absence.
25 Jun 1721	John Rowe; William Sedden (Water Bailiff)	Deputy governor	Governor Horne	To serve during Governor Horne's absence.
23 Apr 1723	John Sanforth (Water Bailiff)	Deputy governor	Governor Horne	To serve during Governor Horne's absence.
29 Apr 1723	Deemster Daniel McYlrea	Deputy governor	Governor Horne	To act jointly with Deputy Governor Sanforth during Governor Horne's absence.
22 May 1723	John Sanforth (Water Bailiff); Deemster Daniel McYlrea; John Rowe	Deputy governor		If one be sick or absent, the other two to act jointly. (This was probably a temporary appointment during vacancy in governorship.)
3 Oct 1723	John Lloyd	Governor or lieutenant	Lord of Mann (James Stanley, 10th Earl of Derby)	
27 Feb 1724/5	John Rowe; Nicholas Christian; John Sanforth (Water Bailiff)	Deputy governor	Lord of Mann (James Stanley, 10th Earl of Derby)	This was probably a temporary appointment during a vacancy in governorship.
14 Sep 1725	Thomas Horton	Deputy lieutenant governor	Lord of Mann (James Stanley, 10th Earl of Derby)	
12 May 1726	James Horton; John Brownell; Maj. Gen. John Woods	Deputy governor	Governor Horton	To act during governor's absence from the Isle of Man. If one be sick the other two to act jointly.
9 Jul 1727	James Horton; John Brownell; Maj. Gen. John Woods	Deputy governor	Governor Horton	To act during governor's absence from the Isle of Man. If one be sick the other two to act jointly.
13 Jul 1727	James Horton; John Brownell; Maj. Gen. John Woods	Deputy governor	Governor Horton	To act during governor's absence from the Isle of Man. If one be sick the other two to act jointly.
12 Jul 1728	James Horton; John Brownell; Maj. Gen. John Woods	Deputy governor	Governor Horton	To act during governor's absence from the Isle of Man. If one be sick the other two to act jointly.
5 Mar 1728/9	James Horton; John Brownell; Maj. Gen. John Woods	Deputy governor	Governor Horton	To act during governor's absence from the Isle of Man.
25 Jun 1731	James Horton; Deemster Charles Moore	Deputy governor	Governor Horton	To act during governor's absence from the Isle of Man.
30 Jun 1732	James Horton; Deemster Charles Moore	Deputy governor	Governor Horton	To act during governor's absence from the Isle of Man.
30 Jun 1733	James Horton; William Stonier; Deemster Charles Moore	Deputy governor	Governor Horton	To act during governor's absence from the Isle of Man. If one be sick the other two to act jointly.
29 Apr 1734	James Horton; William Stonier; Deemster Charles Moore	Deputy governor	Governor Horton	To act during governor's absence from Isle of Man. If one be sick or absent, other two to act jointly.
30 Jul 1734	James Horton; William Stonier; Deemster Charles Moore	Deputy governor	Governor Horton	
26 Dec 1734	William Stonier; Deemster Charles Moore	Deputy governor	Governor Horton	To act during absence of governor.
8 Oct 1735	Deemster Charles Moore; Deemster Daniel McYlrea	Deputy governor	Governor Horton	To act during governor's absence.
9 Mar 1736	James Murray, 2nd Duke of Atholl	Governor and commander-in-chief		On the death of 10th Earl of Derby.
1736–37	Deemster Charles Moore; Deemster Daniel McYlrea	Deputy governor	Governor Murray	To act during governor's absence from island.
7 Apr 1744	Deemster John Taubman; Deemster Daniel McYlrea	Deputy governor	Governor Murray	To act during governor's absence from island. Each empowered to act during incapacity by sickness or other impediment of the other.
1 Jun 1744	Patrick Lindesay	Governor and commander-in-chief	Lord of Mann James, 2nd Duke of Atholl	
27 May 1746	Deemster John Taubman; Deemster Daniel McYlrea	Deputy governor	Governor Lindesay	The commission states that the governor, by his present indisposition, is disabled from attending the Courts on the next Circuit (that is, of the Sheading or Common Law Courts). The deputies to act during the governor's illness. (This is a case where deputies were appointed whilst the governor was on the island.)
14 Jul 1749	Deemster John Taubman; Deemster Daniel McYlrea	Deputy governor	Governor Lindesay	The commission states that the governor by his present indisposition in unable to execute his post and office. The deputies to act during his illness. (Similar to the case preceding, deputies were appointed whilst governor was on the island).
2 May 1751	Basil Cochrane	Governor and commander-in-chief	Lord of Mann James, 2nd Duke of Atholl	
17 May 1760	Deemster John Taubman; Daniel McYlrea (Receiver General)	Deputy governor	Basil Cochrane, governor	To act during governor's absence from the Isle of Man. Each empowered to act in case of sickness or other impediment of the other.
26 Mar 1761	Deemster John Taubman; Daniel McYlrea (Receiver General)	Deputy governor	Basil Cochrane, governor	To act during governor's absence from the Isle of Man. Each empowered to act in case of sickness or other impediment of the other.
2 Jun 1761	Deemster John Taubman; Daniel McYlrea (Receiver General)	Deputy governor	Basil Cochrane, governor	The governor being ex officio be jointly chancellors with respect to the causes to be heard.
8 Jul 1761	Deemster John Taubman; Daniel McYlrea (Receiver General)	Deputy governor	Basil Cochrane, governor	To act during the governor's absence from the island. Each empowered to act in case of sickness or incapacity of others.
22 Jul 1761	John Wood	Governor and commander-in-chief	Lord of Mann James, 2nd Duke of Atholl	
1 Oct 1763	Daniel McYlrea (Receiver General)	Deputy governor	Governor Wood	The commission states that the governor by his present indisposition is rendered incapable of presiding at the Sheading Courts which are to be held at Peel.
18 May 1764	Daniel McYlrea (Receiver General)	Deputy governor	Governor Wood	
16 Dec 1764	John Wood	Governor and commander-in-chief	Lady of Mann (Charlotte Murray, Duchess of Atholl with the concurrence of her husband)	This is a re-appointment following the accession to the throne of King George III.
Revestment
21 Jun 1765	John Wood	Governor-in-chief and captain general	King George III	This is a re-appointment following the Revestment.
6 Aug 1773	Henry Hope	Lieutenant governor	King George III	To act in the absence of Governor Wood and to perform the duties of governor *First appointment of lieutenant governor.
13 Jul 1775	Richard Dawson	Lieutenant governor	King George III	
31 May 1777	Edward Smith	Governor-in-chief & captain general	King George III	Appointed following the death of Governor Wood.
31 May 1777	Richard Dawson	Lieutenant governor	King George III	
26 Nov 1790	Alexander Shaw	Lieutenant governor	King George III	
14 Feb 1793	John Murray, 4th Duke of Atholl	Governor-in-chief & captain general	King George III	
4 Aug 1804	Henry Murray	Lieutenant governor	John Murray, 4th Duke of Atholl	The commission states: "Whereas the Honourable Alexander Shaw, last Lieutenant Governor of this Isle, hath resigned the said office of Lieutenant Governor, and no other person hath yet been appointed by His Majesty to fill the same: And whereas I find it necessary to remove forthwith from the said Isle to attend public business in Great Britain." The lieutenant governor is appointed to act during the absence of the governor-in-chief or until His Majesty's pleasure be known. [This is the only appointment of a lieutenant governor made by a governor of the Isle of Man since the Revestment].
8 Jun 1805	Cornelius Smelt	Lieutenant governor	King George III	Appointment in like terms as Lieutenant Governor Dawson's appointment in 1777. Died in office.
1 Dec 1832	John Ready	Lieutenant governor	King William IV	The appointment is simply to be lieutenant governor during pleasure.
21 Nov 1837	John Ready	Lieutenant governor	Queen Victoria	New appointment following the accession of Queen Victoria. Died in office.
8 Aug 1845	Charles Hope	Lieutenant governor	Queen Victoria	
13 Sep 1860	Mark Hildesley Quayle, Clerk of the Rolls	Lieutenant governor	Queen Victoria	To act as deputy governor to exercise all functions and powers of such office until a lieutenant governor shall have been appointed.
20 Oct 1860	Francis Pigott Stainsby Conant	Lieutenant governor	Queen Victoria	Similar appointment as Lieutenant Governors Ready and Hope. Died in office.
28 Jan 1863	Mark Hildesley Quayle, Clerk of the Rolls	Lieutenant governor	Queen Victoria	To act as deputy governor to exercise all functions and powers of such office until a lieutenant governor shall have been appointed.
29 Jan 1863	Henry Loch	Lieutenant governor	Queen Victoria	To act as lieutenant governor during pleasure.
24 Apr 1882	Spencer Walpole	Lieutenant governor	Queen Victoria	Henniker died in office.
1893	Joseph West Ridgeway	Lieutenant governor	Queen Victoria	Henniker died in office.
1895	John Henniker-Major, 5th Baron Henniker	Lieutenant governor	Queen Victoria	Henniker died in office.
Jul 1902	James Gell, Clerk of the Rolls	Deputy governor	King Edward VII	To act as such during the indisposition of Lieutenant Governor Henniker. Appointed deputy governor in the first place.
Oct 1902	James Gell, Clerk of the Rolls	Acting governor	King Edward VII	Following the death of Lieutenant Governor Henniker. (Office therefore as acting governor carried with it greater authority than that of lieutenant governor.)
1902	George Fitzroy Henry Somerset, 3rd Baron Raglan	Lieutenant governor	King Edward VII	
1919	William Fry	Lieutenant governor	King George V	
1928	Claude Hill	Lieutenant governor	King George V	
1932	Montagu Sherard Dawes Butler	Lieutenant governor	King George V	
1937	William Spencer Leveson-Gower, 4th Earl Granville	Lieutenant governor	King George VI	
1945	Geoffrey Rhodes Bromet	Lieutenant governor	King George VI	
1952	Ambrose Dundas Flux Dundas	Lieutenant governor	Queen Elizabeth II	
1959	Ronald Herbert Garvey	Lieutenant governor	Queen Elizabeth II	
1966	Peter Hyla Gawne Stallard	Lieutenant governor	Queen Elizabeth II	
1974	John Warburton Paul	Lieutenant governor	Queen Elizabeth II	
1980	Nigel Cecil	Lieutenant governor	Queen Elizabeth II	
1985	Laurence New	Lieutenant governor	Queen Elizabeth II	
1990	Laurence Jones	Lieutenant governor	Queen Elizabeth II	Died in office.
1995	Timothy Daunt	Lieutenant governor	Queen Elizabeth II	
2000	Ian David Macfadyen	Lieutenant governor	Queen Elizabeth II	
Sep 2005	Michael Kerruish, First Deemster	Deputy governor	Queen Elizabeth II	Acting during vacancy.
Oct 2005	Michael Kerruish	Deputy governor	Queen Elizabeth II	
2005	Paul Haddacks	Lieutenant governor	Queen Elizabeth II	
2011	Adam Wood	Lieutenant governor	Queen Elizabeth II	
2016	Richard Gozney	Lieutenant governor	Queen Elizabeth II	
2021	John Lorimer	Lieutenant governor	Queen Elizabeth II	
2021	John Lorimer	Lieutenant governor	King Charles III	

== See also ==
- Governors of the Isle of Man
- King of Mann
- Lord of Mann
