= Governor of the Isle of Man =

The title of Governor of the Isle of Man existed until 1828. Other titles were also used, especially before 1595.

- Holan (1219–?), titled Seneschal
- List incomplete
- Fogall McHascatt (1260–?), titled Seneschal
- Godfrey MacManus (1266–?), titled Bailiff
- Alan of Galloway, titled Bailiff
- Maurice Okerfair, titled Bailiff
- Reginald the Chaplain, titled Bailiff
- Brennus, titled Bailiff
- Donald, titled Bailiff
- Walter de Huntercombe (1290–93), titled Custodian
- List incomplete

The following were Governors of the Isle of Man:

- Sir Thomas Gerrard (1595–1596)
- Peter Legh (captain; 1596-?)
- John Ireland
- John Greenhalgh (1640–51)
- William Christian (1656–?)
- James Chaloner (1658–1660)
- Thomas Fairfax, 3rd Lord Fairfax of Cameron (1660)
- Thomas Cobbe?
- Isaac Barrow (1664–?)
- Nicholas Stanley (1696–1701)
- Charles Zedenno Stanley (1702–1703)
- Robert Mawdesley (1703–1713)
- Charles Zedenno Stanley (1713)
- Alexander Horne (1713–1723)
- John Lloyd (1723–1725)
- Thomas Horton (1725–1736)
- James Murray, 2nd Duke of Atholl (1736–1744)
- Patrick Lindsay (1744–1751)
- Basil Cochrane (1751–1761)
- John Wood (1761–1777)
- Edward Smith (1777–1793)
- John Murray, 4th Duke of Atholl (1793–1828)

== See also ==
- Lieutenant Governor of the Isle of Man
- King of Mann
- Lord of Mann
