= 2025 in the Isle of Man =

- Centuries
- Decades
- See also: List of years in the Isle of Man; History of the Isle of Man; 2025 in: The UK • England • Wales • Elsewhere

Events in the year 2025 in the Isle of Man.

== Incumbents ==
- Lord of Mann: Charles III
- Lieutenant governor: John Lorimer
- Chief minister: Alfred Cannan

== Events ==
=== January ===
- 2 January – New regulations banning the installation of fossil fuel heating systems in new build homes are implemented as part of the Climate Change Act 2021.
- 3 January – Start of the Ukrainian Permission Extension, allowing Ukrainian nationals already living on the Isle of Man to extend their stay by a further 18 months.
- 4 January – An amber weather alert is issued for snow for the following day.
- 6 January – The Met Office confirms that Christmas Day 2024 was the second warmest on record, with temperatures reaching 11°C.
- 8 January – The Department of Infrastructure confirms that public sector rents will increase by 5% from 7 April.
- 10 January – Doctors reject a 6% pay offer from Manx Care.
- 14 January – The British Medical Association announces that doctors will begin a 48-hour strike on 22 January after rejecting a pay increase from Manx Care. The strike would be the first to be staged by doctors in the island's history.
- 19 January – Isle of Man Post Office releases a set of stamps celebrating 60 years of the Isle of Man Arts Council.
- 21 January –
  - Restrictions are placed on the import of animals from Germany to stem the spread of foot-and-mouth disease.
  - A planned 48-hour strike by doctors is called off following a revised pay offer from Manx Care.
- 23 January –
  - Tynwald approves a £2.4m regeneration scheme for the retail, leisure and hospitality sectors to improve trade and create jobs.
  - A red weather warning is issued for "violent storm force winds" ahead of the arrival of Storm Eowyn, which is expected to cause widespread disruption.
- 24 January – Tynwald approves £16.3m in funding for a new respite centre, a housing project and an updated airport drainage scheme.
- 28 January – The Assisted Dying Bill 2023, giving people aged over the age of 18 who are terminally ill and have a prognosis of less than 12 months the option choose to end their lives, passes its final stage in the Legislative Council. It will now be returned to the House of Keys for final approval before being presented for royal assent.
- 29 January – Doctors belonging to the British Medical Association vote to accept an 8% pay increase from Manx Care.

=== February ===
- 1 February – The payment of benefits and pensions in cash is phased out for new claimants, with all benefits to be paid directly into a designated bank account.
- 6 February – The Isle of Man Met Office issues a yellow weather warning for snow and ice overnight.
- 11 February – EasyJet cuts back flights between Isle of Man Airport and Manchester and Liverpool following a fall in demand.
- 12 February – A 2,000 year old bronze spoon, believed to have been used in ceremonies to predict the future, and the first of its kind to be found on the Isle of Man, is unearthed by a metal detectorist.
- 17 February – Sir John Lorimer's tenure as Lieutenant Governor is extended for a further 11 months, from September 2026 to August 2027, to avoid the end of his term clashing with the 2026 general election.
- 18 February –
  - Treasury Minister Alex Allinson delivers the 2025–26 budget. Highlights include a 1% reduction in the higher rate of personal income tax and an uplift in personal allowances.
  - The Royal College of Nursing is to ballot its members on strike action over a pay dispute with Manx Care.
- 21 February – Tynwald votes to approve an increase in the minimum wage from April, with the hourly rate increasing from £11.45 to £12.25 from 1 April, and the youth rate increasing from £8.75 to £9.55.

=== March ===
- 4 March – Gary Clueit, Kirstie Morphet and Peter Reid are elected to the Legislative Council for a five-year term, while Rob Mercer is elected for a second term.
- 11 March – Gary Clueit, Kirstie Morphet, Peter Reid and Rob Mercer are sworn in as members of the Legislative Council.
- 14 March –
  - Nurses on the Isle of Man have voted to take strike action after rejecting the offer of a 4% pay increase.
  - Douglas city councillor Frank Schuengel is removed from office after missing three months of meetings.
- 16 March – Poet and playwright Annie Kissack is awarded the Reih Bleeaney Vanannan, or Manannan's Choice of the Year, by Culture Vannin.
- 20 March – The Isle of Man stages its first ever drone show to mark the first anniversary of Douglas becoming a city.
- 21 March – A number of proposed reforms to Legislative Council elections, such as limiting MLCs to two terms in office, are rejected by Tynwald members.
- 24 March – Andy Ralphs resigns as chief executive of the Isle of Man civil service.
- 25 March – Tynwald approves the Assisted Dying Bill 2023, which will now be sent for royal assent, making the Isle of Man the first part of the British Isles to legalise assisted dying for terminally ill people.
- 28 March – Manx Care extends its contract with the Great North Air Ambulance Service for a further twelve months, maintaining the service for emergency patients who need airlifting to the UK.

=== April ===
- 1 April – Manx Care is ordered to conduct a review of how it deals with personal data requests after "systemic failures" were found in its handling processes.
- 2 April – Public sector workers secure a 4% pay rise after an offer is accepted by the Unite and Prospect trade unions.
- 24 April – The Isle of Man local authority elections are held. Those elected include former chief minister Tony Brown, who is elected to Castletown Commissioners.

=== May ===
- 1 May – Eight new matrons take up their positions at Noble's Hospital.
- 8 May – A free big band concert and military service takes place at the Royal Hall at the Villa Marina to mark the 80th anniversary of VE Day.
- 12 May – Infrastructure Minister Michelle Haywood confirms that driving licences in the Isle of Man will go digital from July.
- 14 May –
  - Pub chain JD Wetherspoon opens its first outlet on the Isle of Man, The Conister Arms in Douglas.
  - Steven Crellin is sworn in as Mayor of Douglas for 2025–26.
- 15 May – The Infrastructure Department confirms that updates will be made to the Manx Highway Code, with changes expected in the autumn.
- 19 May – Applications and claims for Income Support can now be made online as the Manx Government seeks to modernise its services.
- 21 May – Plans to lower the speed limit to 20mph in some residential areas are approved.
- 29 May – Police launch a murder inquiry following the death of a boy, named subsequently as 14-year-old Christopher McBurnie, after an incident in Ramsey.

=== June ===
- 10 June – John Sherrington, the newly appointed Roman Catholic Archbishop of Liverpool, is installed as Catholic Bishop of the Isle of Man in a ceremony at St Mary of the Isle Church.
- 11 June – Data published by the Met Office indicates that 2025 saw the Isle of Man experience its warmest and sunniest spring since records began, with temperatures averaging 13.7C (56.7F).
- 20 June – The Communications and Utilities Regulatory Authority announces a 5.3% increase in gas bills from July, due partly to a drop in use of gas over a warmer than average spring.
- 24 June – Education Minister Daphne Caine confirms that University College Isle of Man will no longer provide courses in History and Heritage, Creative Practice or Health and Social Care from September.
- 27 June – The Sir Mark Cavendish Raceway is officially opened at the National Sports Centre in Douglas.
- 30 June – Fees for prescriptions, dental services and eye tests are frozen until after the 2026 general election.

=== July ===
- 3 July – Manx Telecom announces a 3.5% price rise from 1 August.
- 15 July – Tynwald approves an extra £15.3m to cover an overspend of healthcare during 2024–25.
- 17 July – Tynwald backs plans to base the minimum wage on a percentage of median earnings instead of aligning it with the living wage.
- 21 July – Russ Foster, chief constable of Isle of Man Constabulary, releases his annual report, which indicated 40% of Isle of Man prison inmates have links to organised crime, while overall crime fell by 10% during the 2024–25 financial year.
- 22 July – Tynwald approves the Childhood Inclusion Scheme, a scheme designed to improve provisions for children with additional needs.
- 25 July – Tynwald votes to endorse the UK and United Nations calls for humanitarian intervention in Gaza.

=== August ===
- 11 August –
  - The Isle of Man Steam Packet Company confirms a small number of people received minor injuries after the MV Manxman made an abortive entry into Heysham Port in Lancashire.
  - School leaders belonging to the National Association of Head Teachers vote to take industrial action short of striking following a dispute with the Department of Education, Sport and Culture over what they describe as the "misuse of disciplinary procedures".
- 12 August – An online portal to purchase prepayment certificates is launched for patients who require regular prescriptions for medication.
- 15 August – A two-minute silence is held to mark the 80th anniversary of VJ Day. It is preceded by a service at the National War Memorial, where Chief Minister Alfred Cannan lays a wreath to pay tribute to those killed in the Far East campaign.
- 26 August – The National Association of Head Teachers calls off planned industrial action by head teachers in the Isle of Man after reaching a settlement with the Department for Education, Sport and Culture.
- 31 August – Bradley Chambers becomes the 11th Manx Bard.

=== September ===
- 2 September – The Met Office confirms that August on the Isle of Man has been warmer and drier than the 30-year average.
- 5 September –
  - The Met Office confirms that the Isle of Man experienced its warmest summer on record during 2025.
  - At a hearing at Douglas Courthouse, Paul Whysall, aged 80, is sentenced to 12 years in prison for 22 counts of indecent assault against three boys and a 19-year-old woman which occurred between 1995 and 2023.
- 8 September – Education Minister Daphne Caine reports that the island-wide ban on mobile phones in schools, introduced in September 2024, is "working well" and proving to be a "popular" policy.
- 9 September – Thirteen landmarks, including the Royal Chapel in St John's, School of Art in Douglas, and Moore's Bridge in Laxey are added to the Protected Buildings Register.
- 15 September – Paloma Faith delivers the Isle of Man Arts Council's annual lecture at the Gaiety Theatre in Douglas.
- 18 September –
  - Mark Lewin is appointed Chief Executive of the Isle of Man Civil Service.
  - Ramsey commissioner Elizabeth Shimmin is investigated by police after an alleged social media post which said US right-wing commentator Charlie Kirk should "burn in hell". Police say the matter will not be taken any further.
- 22 September – The Isle of Man Government publishes proposals for the child first policy, a framework to ensure government decisions, policies and programmes prioritise the best interests of young people.
- 23 September – Plans are announced for the establishment of an office for AI development and regulation.
- 25 September – Tynwald agrees to use a new method for calculating the minimum wage, which, if approved by government, could see the hourly wage increased from £12.25 to £13.46 from 2026.
- 26 September – The Treasury drops plans to introduce a 2% health levy to raise an extra £28m for health services.
- 30 September – Face-to-face classes for new parents are to return from October after they were moved online in 2024.

=== October ===
- 2 October – The Met Office issues a yellow weather alert for wind ahead of the arrival of Storm Amy, with the alert in place from 4 p.m. on 3 October to 6 p.m. on 4 October.
- 3 October – Ferry services between the Isle of Man and the UK mainland are cancelled for the following day after Storm Amy brings high winds.
- 6 October –
  - Treasury Minister Alex Allinson says that plans for a 2% levy to boost funding for health services were scrapped following a "large number of negative responses" from Isle of Man residents.
  - The Islands Energy Group, the main utility provider for the UK's three crown dependencies, confirms a customer call centre will return to the Isle of Man in 2026.
- 7 October – Publication of the Public Health Strategy 2025-30, which aims to "prioritise prevention" at all stages of life to "reduce avoidable illness".
- 8 October – New rules requiring dogs being imported from Romania to be tested for brucella canis, a disease that can be passed to humans, come into force.
- 9 October – Members of the Unite union vote to reject a 3% pay offer for public sector workers on the Isle of Man, meaning the dispute will go to arbitration.
- 13 October – COVID-19 in the Isle of Man: The autumn booster vaccine programme for those aged over 75 begins.
- 15 October – Data published by Statistics Isle of Man indicates a 20-year low in the island's number of GPs.
- 17 October – The Department of Health announces that a chickenpox vaccine will be added to the free combined vaccinations offered to children, with around 1,500 children receiving the vaccine each year.

== Sports ==
- 26 May – The 2025 Isle of Man TT begins.
- 4 September – The Department for Enterprise confirms a number of changes for the 2026 Isle of Man TT, including more rest days and longer contingency periods.

== Deaths ==
- 3 July – Tim Baker, 59, British born Manx politician, MHK (2016–2021), Infrastructure Minister (2020–2021).
- 8 September – Geoff Corkish, 72, politician, MHK (2006–2018), cancer.
- 14 September – Richard McNicholl, politician (Mayor of Douglas), cancer.
- 19 September – Bryan Kneale, 95, Manx artist and sculptor. (death announced on this date)
