= 2026 in the Isle of Man =

- Centuries
- Decades
- See also: List of years in the Isle of Man; History of the Isle of Man; 2026 in: The UK • England • Wales • Elsewhere

Events in the year 2026 in the Isle of Man.

== Incumbents ==
- Lord of Mann: Charles III
- Lieutenant governor: John Lorimer
- Chief minister: Alfred Cannan

== Events ==
- 24 September – 2026 Manx general election

== Sports ==
- 25 May–6 June – 2026 Isle of Man TT

== Deaths ==
- 2 August – John Wannenburgh, MHK (since 2021)
- 1 October – George Waft, 89, politician
