= 2021 in the Isle of Man =

- Centuries
- Decades
- See also: List of years in the Isle of Man; History of the Isle of Man; 2021 in: The UK • England • Wales • Elsewhere

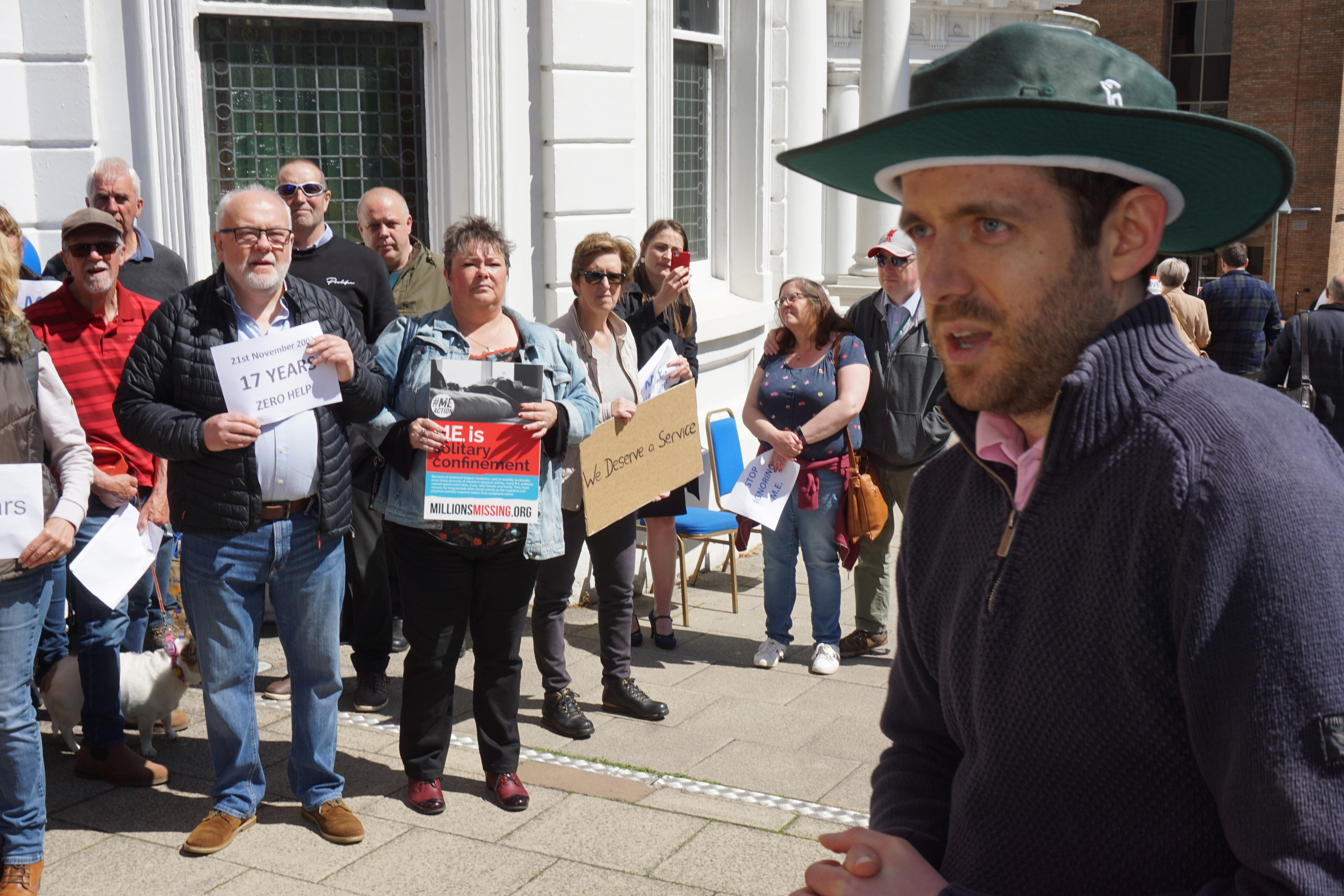
Juan Corlett speaking at a protest about ME

Events in the year 2021 in the Isle of Man.

== Incumbents ==
- Lord of Mann: Elizabeth II
- Lieutenant governor: John Lorimer
- Chief minister: Howard Quayle (until 12 October); Alfred Cannan onwards

== Events ==
Ongoing: COVID-19 pandemic in the Isle of Man

- 23 September: 2021 Manx general election
- 12 October: Alfred Cannan is elected as chief minister.

== Deaths ==
- 30 April: William Cain, 85, lawyer, First Deemster (1998–2003).
- 28 August: Noel Cringle, 83, politician, president of Tynwald (2000–2011).
