= 2023 in the Isle of Man =

- Centuries
- Decades
- See also: List of years in the Isle of Man; History of the Isle of Man; 2023 in: The UK • England • Wales • Elsewhere

Events in the year 2023 in the Isle of Man.

== Incumbents ==
- Lord of Mann: Charles III
- Lieutenant governor: John Lorimer
- Chief minister: Alfred Cannan

== Events ==
Ongoing: COVID-19 pandemic in the Isle of Man

- May: The Isle of Man's Medical Director, Dr Rosalind Ranson, was unfairly dismissed from her position after raising serious questions about the COVID strategy. She was awarded £3M compensation in May 2023.

== Sports ==
- 29 May: 2023 Isle of Man TT
  - The event saw the passing of one competitor on the final lap of the first Supertwin TT, Spanish rider Raul Torras Martinez.

== Deaths ==
- 18 July: Walter Gilbey, 88, British-Manx politician and entrepreneur, member of the House of Keys (1982–2001).
- 27 December: Leonard Singer, 80, British-born Manx politician, member of the House of Keys (2001–2006, 2011–2016).
