= 2020 in the Isle of Man =

- Centuries
- Decades
- See also: List of years in the Isle of Man; History of the Isle of Man; 2020 in: The UK • England • Wales • Elsewhere

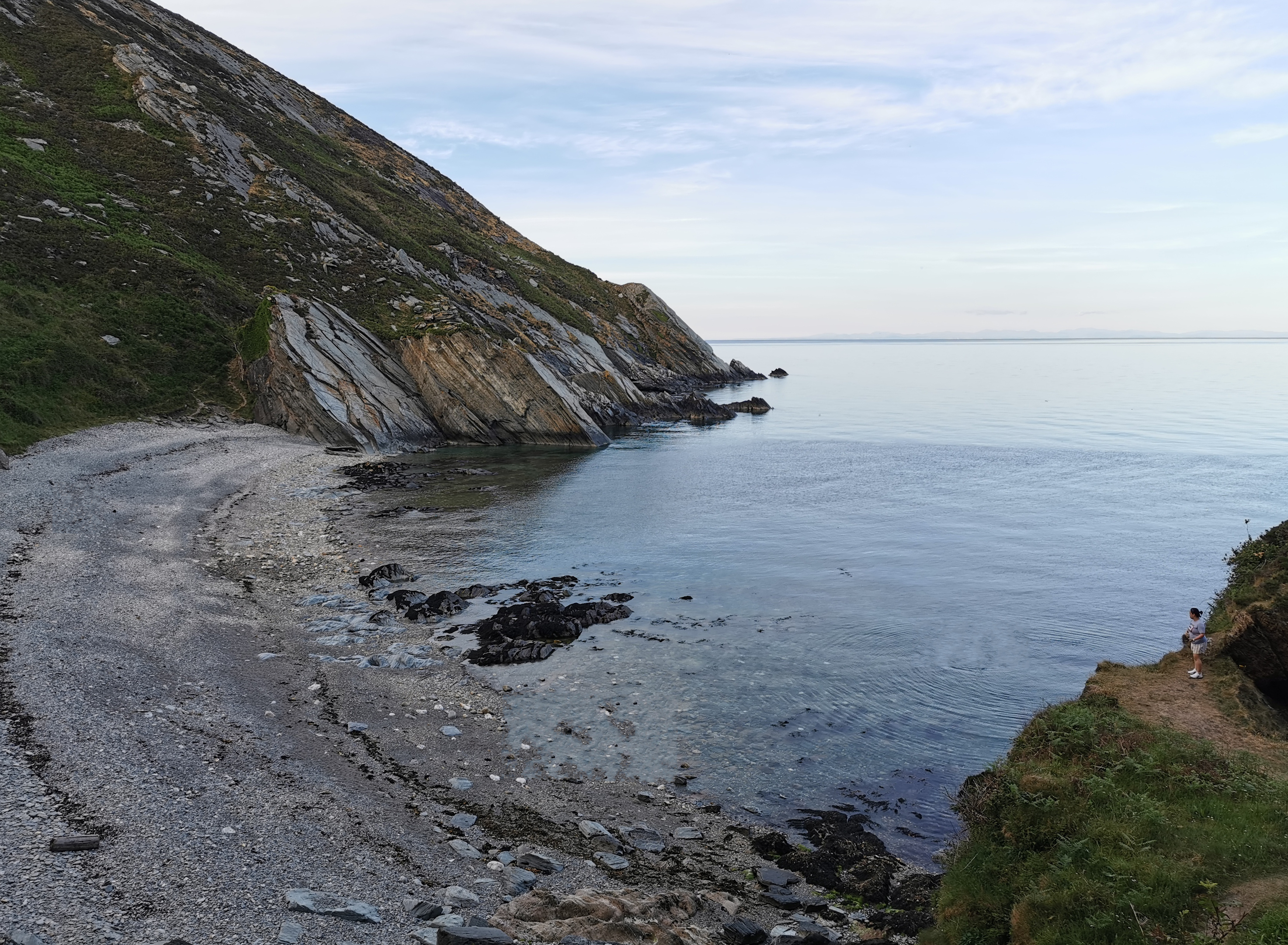
Beach in Isle of Man photographed in the afternoon.

Events in the year 2020 in the Isle of Man.

== Incumbents ==
- Lord of Mann: Elizabeth II
- Lieutenant governor: Richard Gozney
- Chief minister: Howard Quayle

== Events ==
Ongoing: COVID-19 pandemic in the Isle of Man

- The parishes of Arbory and Rushen merged to become the local authority area of Arbory and Rushen.
- 19 March: The first case of COVID-19 was reported.
- 26 March: A lockdown began due to rising cases of COVID-19.
- 1 April: The first COVID-19 related death was reported.

== Sports ==
- 2019–20 Isle of Man Football League

== Deaths ==
- 20 February: Bill Malarkey, 68, politician, MHK (2006–2011, since 2015), cancer.
- 27 February: David Callister, 84, broadcaster and politician.
- 13 October: Chris Killip, 74, photographer, lung cancer.
