= 2022 in the Isle of Man =

- Centuries
- Decades
- See also: List of years in the Isle of Man; History of the Isle of Man; 2022 in: The UK • England • Wales • Elsewhere

Events in the year 2022 in the Isle of Man.

== Incumbents ==
- Lord of Mann: Elizabeth II (until 8 September); Charles III onwards
- Lieutenant governor: John Lorimer
- Chief minister: Alfred Cannan

== Events ==
Ongoing: COVID-19 pandemic in the Isle of Man

- 6 February: During the Platinum Jubilee of Elizabeth II, Douglas was granted city status.
- 8 May: Following the Coronation of Charles III and Camilla, a public holiday is declared.
- 8 September: Elizabeth II dies at Balmoral Castle, Scotland, Charles III assumed position of Lord of Mann.
- 9 September: As with other locations throughout the Commonwealth, a death gun salute of 96 rounds representing the years of the Queen's life were fired.

== Sports ==
- 29 May: 2022 Isle of Man TT

== Deaths ==
- 31 July: David Cannan, 85, politician, MHK (1982–2011).
