= 2016 in the Isle of Man =

- Centuries
- Decades
- See also: List of years in the Isle of Man; History of the Isle of Man; 2016 in: The UK • England • Wales • Elsewhere

Events in the year 2016 in the Isle of Man.

== Incumbents ==
- Lord of Mann: Elizabeth II
- Lieutenant governor: Adam Wood (until 27 May); Richard Gozney onwards
- Chief minister: Allan Bell (until 4 October); Howard Quayle onwards

== Events ==
- 27 May – 10 June: 2016 Isle of Man TT
  - The event was marred by the death of 4 competitors: Dwight Beare, Paul Shoesmith, Ian Bell and Andrew Soar.
- 22 September: 2016 Manx general election.

== Sports ==
- 2017–18 Isle of Man Football League
