= 2027 in the Isle of Man =

- Centuries
- Decades
- See also: List of years in the Isle of Man; History of the Isle of Man; 2027 in: The UK • England • Wales • Elsewhere

Events in the year 2027 in the Isle of Man.

== Incumbents ==
- Lord of Mann: Charles III
- Lieutenant governor: John Lorimer
- Chief minister: Alfred Cannan

== Sports ==
- 31 May–12 June – 2027 Isle of Man TT
