= 2019 in the Isle of Man =

- Centuries
- Decades
- See also: List of years in the Isle of Man; History of the Isle of Man; 2019 in: The UK • England • Wales • Elsewhere

Events in the year 2019 in the Isle of Man.

== Incumbents ==
- Lord of Mann: Elizabeth II
- Lieutenant governor: Richard Gozney
- Chief minister: Howard Quayle

== Events ==
- 25 May–7 June: 2019 Isle of Man TT
- 1 October: Severe flooding affects Laxey.

== Sports ==
- 2018–19 Isle of Man Football League

== Deaths ==
- 18 January: Brian Stowell, 82, reporter (Manx Radio), linguist, physicist and author, Reih Bleeaney Vanannan winner (2008).
- 6 April: Jack Corrin, 87, jurist and politician, First Deemster (1988–1998).
