= 2024 in the Isle of Man =

- Centuries
- Decades
- See also: List of years in the Isle of Man; History of the Isle of Man; 2024 in: The UK • England • Wales • Elsewhere

Events in the year 2024 in the Isle of Man.

== Incumbents ==
- Lord of Mann: Charles III
- Lieutenant governor: John Lorimer
- Chief minister: Alfred Cannan

== Events ==
- 20 March – Queen Camilla confers city status on Douglas in a ceremony at the city hall.
- 5 June – Michael Dunlop surpassed his uncle Joey Dunlop as the most successful TT rider, with 29 TT wins.
- 25 July – Education Minister Daphne Caine confirms an island-wide ban on mobile phones in primary and secondary schools will be introduced in the 2024–25 academic year.

== Sports ==
- 1 June – 2024 Isle of Man TT
