= 2017 in the Isle of Man =

- Centuries
- Decades
- See also: List of years in the Isle of Man; History of the Isle of Man; 2017 in: The UK • England • Wales • Elsewhere

Events in the year 2017 in the Isle of Man.

== Incumbents ==
- Lord of Mann: Elizabeth II
- Lieutenant governor: Richard Gozney
- Chief minister: Howard Quayle

== Events ==
- 27 May – 9 June: 2017 Isle of Man TT
  - The event was marred by the deaths of 3 competitors: Davey Lambert, Jochem van den Hoek, and Alan Bonner.

== Sports ==
- 2017–18 Isle of Man Football League
