= 2011 in the Isle of Man =

- Centuries
- Decades
- See also: List of years in the Isle of Man; History of the Isle of Man; 2011 in: The UK • England • Wales • Elsewhere

Events in the year 2011 in the Isle of Man.

== Incumbents ==
- Lord of Mann: Elizabeth II
- Lieutenant governor: Paul Haddacks, Adam Wood
- Chief Minister: Tony Brown, Allan Bell

== Events ==
- 14 January: Health officials raise concerns over the island experiencing a shortage of the seasonal flu vaccine
- 19 January: Peter Kelly is appointed Captain of Onchan Parish
- 10 February: Manx2 flight MN7100 crashes in the Republic of Ireland, killing six and injuring two
- 18 February: Andrew Corlett is appointed as second deemster
- 26 April: Stunt Performer Matt the Manx Crank dies in a Human Cannonball stunt in Kent
- 29 September: 2011 Manx general election

== Sports ==
- 2011 Isle of Man TT
- 2010–11 Isle of Man League

== Deaths ==
- 21 October: George Daniels, 85, Horologist
