= 2018 in the Isle of Man =

- Centuries
- Decades
- See also: List of years in the Isle of Man; History of the Isle of Man; 2018 in: The UK • England • Wales • Elsewhere

Events in the year 2018 in the Isle of Man.

== Incumbents ==
- Lord of Mann: Elizabeth II
- Lieutenant governor: Richard Gozney
- Chief minister:Howard Quayle

== Events ==
- 25 May–7 June: 2018 Isle of Man TT

== Sports ==
- 2017–18 Isle of Man Football League

== Deaths ==
- 11 April: Jim Caine, 91, jazz pianist and radio presenter.
- 30 May: Dan Kneen, 30, motorcycle rider.
