= 2013 in the Isle of Man =

- Centuries
- Decades
- See also: List of years in the Isle of Man; History of the Isle of Man; 2013 in: The UK • England • Wales • Elsewhere

Events in the year 2013 in the Isle of Man.

== Incumbents ==
- Lord of Mann: Elizabeth II
- Lieutenant governor: Adam Wood
- Chief minister: Allan Bell

== Events ==
- 25 May – 7 June: 2013 Isle of Man TT
- The Ellan Vannin football team is established.
