= 2010 in the Isle of Man =

- Centuries
- Decades
- See also: List of years in the Isle of Man; History of the Isle of Man; 2010 in: The UK • England • Wales • Elsewhere

Events in the year 2010 in the Isle of Man.

== Incumbents ==
- Lord of Mann: Elizabeth II
- Lieutenant governor: Paul Haddacks
- Chief Minister: Tony Brown

== Events ==
- 29 January: Jon Needham sworn in as High Bailiff
- 8 February: A World War II hand grenade is discovered by a resident in Laxey and recovered by police
- 10 March: Richard Pearson is appointed as Director of Highways
- 16 March: Tynwald passes the Prohibition of Female Genital Mutilation Act and the Lloyds TSB Offshore Limited Banking Business Act
- 13 July: Tynwald passes the Organised and International Crime Act
- 18 June: An unexploded WWII artillery shell is discovered in Ramsey and recovered by police
- 19 October: Tynwald passes the Endangered Species Act, Gambling Supervision Act, Harbours Act, and an amendment to the Electricity Act of 1996
- 14 December: Tynwald amends the Income Tax Act and passes the Incorporated Cell Companies Act

== Sports ==
- 2009–10 Isle of Man League
- 2010 Isle of Man TT
- Rally Isle of Man won by driver Keith Cronin and co-driver Barry McNulty

== Deaths ==
- 17 August: Frank Kermode, 90, Literary Critic
- 4 October: Norman Wisdom, 95, Comedian and Actor
