= 2007 in the Isle of Man =

- Centuries
- Decades
- See also: List of years in the Isle of Man; History of the Isle of Man; 2007 in: The UK • England • Wales • Elsewhere

Events in the year 2007 in the Isle of Man.

== Incumbents ==
- Lord of Mann: Elizabeth II
- Lieutenant governor: Paul Haddacks
- Chief Minister: Tony Brown

== Events ==
- 19 June - Tynwald passes the Civil Service (Amendment) Act of 2007
- 21 June - An inquest is opened into the deaths of Isle of Man TT competitor Mark Ramsbotham and two spectators at the 2007 Isle of Man TT
- 22 June - A tribute is held for a father and son who were killed in a collision on the Mountain Road by a reckless driver
- 28 June - A fundraisor is held for injured Isle of Man TT competitor Shaun Harris
- 29 June - Office of Fair Trading publishes independent review of the island's work permit system
- 6 July - Vandals Damage a war memorial in Churchtown
- 11 July - Tynwald passes the Criminal Justice, Police and Courts Act and Merchant Shipping (Amendment) Act of 2007
- 24 July - Roads Policing Unit debuts fleet of covert enforcement vehicles to increase enforcement of traffic offenses
- 27 July - Eleven scouts represent the island at the World Scout jamboree in Essex
- 30 July - Andrew Corlett is appointed Deputy Deemster
- 3 September - A fire at the Energy from Waste Plant's garbage incinerator is believed to be caused from a car battery
- 14 September - Nigel Godfrey becomes vicar at the Cathedral Church of St German in Peel
- 1 October - Graeme Knowles resigns as Bishop of Sodor and Man
- 16 October - Tynwald passes the Personal Liability (Ministers, Members and Officers) Act of 2007

== Sports ==
- 2007 Isle of Man TT
- Rally Isle of Man won by driver Eugene Donnelly and co-driver Paul Kiely

== Deaths ==
- 8 January - Arthur Cockfield, politician
