= 2015 in the Isle of Man =

- Centuries
- Decades
- See also: List of years in the Isle of Man; History of the Isle of Man; 2015 in: The UK • England • Wales • Elsewhere

Events in the year 2015 in the Isle of Man.

== Incumbents ==
- Lord of Mann: Elizabeth II
- Lieutenant governor: Adam Wood
- Chief minister: Allan Bell

== Events ==
- 30 May – 12 June: 2015 Isle of Man TT
  - The event was marred by the death of 32 year-old French rider Franck Petricola during qualifying.
- 3 December: The Isle of Man is affected by heavy storms.
