= 2014 in the Isle of Man =

- Centuries
- Decades
- See also: List of years in the Isle of Man; History of the Isle of Man; 2014 in: The UK • England • Wales • Elsewhere

Events in the year 2014 in the Isle of Man.

== Incumbents ==
- Lord of Mann: Elizabeth II
- Lieutenant governor: Adam Wood
- Chief minister: Allan Bell

== Events ==
- April: The Manx Utilities Authority was established.
- 24 May – 6 June: 2014 Isle of Man TT
