= General Jacobson =

General Jacobson or Jacobsen may refer to:

- Arnold W. Jacobsen (1892–1970), U.S. Marine Corps major general
- Carsten Jacobson (born 1955), German Army lieutenant general
- James A. Jacobson (fl. 1990s–2020s), U.S. Air Force lieutenant general
- Kevin J. Jacobsen (born 1958), U.S. Air Force brigadier general
