= List of years in the Isle of Man =

This is a list of years in the Isle of Man.

== 19th century ==
1800s
1800
1801
1802
1803
1804
1805
1806
1807
1808
1809

1810s
1810
1811
1812
1813
1814
1815
1816
1817
1818
1819

1820s
1820
1821
1822
1823
1824
1825
1826
1827
1828
1829

1830s
1830
1831
1832
1833
1834
1835
1836
1837
1838
1839

1840s
1840
1841
1842
1843
1844
1845
1846
1847
1848
1849

1850s
1850
1851
1852
1853
1854
1855
1856
1857
1858
1859

1860s
1860
1861
1862
1863
1864
1865
1866
1867
1868
1869

1870s
1870
1871
1872
1873
1874
1875
1876
1877
1878
1879

1880s
1880
1881
1882
1883
1884
1885
1886
1887
1888
1889

1890s
1890
1891
1892
1893
1894
1895
1896
1897
1898
1899

== 20th century ==
1900s
1900
1901
1902
1903
1904
1905
1906
1907
1908
1909

1910s
1910
1911
1912
1913
1914
1915
1916
1917
1918
1919

1920s
1920
1921
1922
1923
1924
1925
1926
1927
1928
1929

1930s
1930
1931
1932
1933
1934
1935
1936
1937
1938
1939

1940s
1940
1941
1942
1943
1944
1945
1946
1947
1948
1949

1950s
1950
1951
1952
1953
1954
1955
1956
1957
1958
1959

1960s
1960
1961
1962
1963
1964
1965
1966
1967
1968
1969

1970s
1970
1971
1972
1973
1974
1975
1976
1977
1978
1979

1980s
1980
1981
1982
1983
1984
1985
1986
1987
1988
1989

1990s
1990
1991
1992
1993
1994
1995
1996
1997
1998
1999

== 21st century ==
2000s
2000
2001
2002
2003
2004
2005
2006
2007
2008
2009

2010s
2010
2011
2012
2013
2014
2015
2016
2017
2018
2019

2020s
2020
2021
2022
2023
2024
2025
2026
2027
2028
2029

== See also ==
- List of years in the United Kingdom
  - List of years in England
  - List of years in Northern Ireland
  - List of years in Wales
- History of the Isle of Man
- History of the United Kingdom
