= Donald Gelling =

Manx politician (born 1938)

Chief Minister of the Isle of Man
- In office 14 December 2004 – 14 December 2006
- Monarch: Elizabeth II
- Lieutenant Governor: Ian Macfadyen; Paul Haddacks
- Preceded by: Richard Corkill
- Succeeded by: Tony Brown
- In office 3 December 1996 – 4 December 2001
- Monarch: Elizabeth II
- Lieutenant Governor: Timothy Daunt; Ian Macfadyen
- Preceded by: Miles Walker
- Succeeded by: Richard Corkill

Personal details
- Born: Donald James Gelling; 5 July 1938 (age 88) Santon, Isle of Man
- Party: Independent
- Spouse: Joan Kelly (m. 1960)
- Children: 4
- Profession: Politician

Donald James Gelling CBE CP, CInstSMM (born 5 July 1938) is a Manx former politician, who is a former Chief Minister of the Isle of Man who served two terms as Head of the Government.

== Early life and career ==
Gelling was born on Tynwald Day (5 July) 1938 in Santon, a village to the south-west of Douglas. He was apprenticed in engineering from 1954 to 1959 and after National Service in the Royal Air Force he became a salesman of agricultural machinery and vehicles. He was a general manager of his company from 1969.

His political career began immediately as his National Service ended in 1961 when he was elected as a Santon Parish Commissioner; he served for 25 years and had five terms as Chairman of the Commissioners. In the Tynwald election of November 1986 Gelling was elected as Member of the House of Keys for Malew and Santon constituency. Like most political figures in the Isle of Man, Gelling does not belong to any political party and has fought elections as an Independent on his own personal record and policies.

Gelling served as Minister of Agriculture, Fisheries and Forestry from 1988 to 1989 and was then appointed to the important role of Minister for Treasury. In this role he kept the Isle of Man's status as a 'tax haven' and moved to build up the financial services sector as Chairman of the Financial Supervision Commission. After the 1996 general election, Gelling was elected Chief Minister of the Isle of Man.

In the November 2001 General Election he was re-elected. He decided to retire from the Chief Ministership the following year and was elected by his Keys colleagues to be a Member of the Legislative Council (MLC). The Legislative Council is the Upper House of Tynwald, the Isle of Man's parliament. He retained his interest in the financial services industry as the head of Isle of Man Finance, a body set up by the Manx Treasury to promote the industry.

After the sudden resignation of Richard Corkill on 2 December 2004 in a financial scandal, Gelling was re-elected as Chief Minister on 14 December. He stayed in office then for exactly two years before stepping down as Chief Minister after the 2006 General Election. He then stood down as an MLC on 18 January 2007, retiring from politics.

== Personal life ==
Gelling has been married to Joan (née Kelly) since 1960, they have 4 children together.

Preceded by Sir Miles Walker	Chief Minister; 1996–2001	Succeeded by Richard Corkill
Preceded by Richard Corkill	Chief Minister; 2004–06	Succeeded by Tony Brown
