= 2027 Isle of Man TT =

Annual motorcycle racing event

2027 Isle of Man TT Races
- Isle of Man TT Mountain Course layout

Race details
- Date: 31 May – 12 June 2026
- Location: Douglas, Isle of Man
- Course: Isle of Man TT Mountain Course; 37.733 mi (60.725 km)

The 2027 Isle of Man TT is scheduled to be held between 31 May and 13 June on the Isle of Man TT Mountain Course.

The schedule was announced during the 2026 Isle of Man TT.
