= Ayre & Michael =

House of Keys constituency in the Isle of Man, UK

Ayre & Michael is a House of Keys constituency in the north of the Isle of Man. It was created for the 2016 general election and elects 2 MHKs.

It is by far the largest Keys constituency in area, and includes the parishes of Michael, Ballaugh, Jurby, Andreas, Bride and Lezayre.

== Elections ==
General election 2021: Ayre & Michael
Party	Candidate	Votes	%
Independent	Alfred Louis Cannan	2,117	36.4
Independent	Timothy David Johnston	1,203	20.7
Independent	Timothy Simon Baker	709	12.2
Liberal Vannin	Paul Weatherall	540	9.3
Independent	John Duncan Livingstone	517	8.9
Independent	Philip John Corkill	378	6.5
Independent	Dr Sosthere Boussougou	189	3.2
Independent	Madeleine Rita Susan Padda Westall	168	2.9
Total votes		5,821	
Total ballots		3,204	
Rejected ballots		6	
Turnout		3,210	62.6
Registered electors		5,127	

General election 2016: Ayre & Michael
Party	Candidate	Votes	%
Independent	Alfred Louis Cannan	1,839	31.2
Independent	Timothy Simon Baker	1,572	26.7
Independent	Carlos Phillips	1,358	23.1
Independent	Louise Elizabeth Whitelegg	638	10.8
Independent	Alan Kermode	440	7.5
Liberal Vannin	Patrick Stephen Ayres	39	0.7
Total votes		5,886	
Total ballots		3,185	
Rejected ballots		7	
Turnout		3,192	65.4
Registered electors		4,884	

There were serious allegations, which were discussed by a Select Committee of Tynwald in 2016–17, about the conduct of this election.
