= Isle of Man Purchase Act 1765 =

Act of the Parliament of Great Britain

Isle of Man Purchase Act 1765 (Note: The citation of this act by this short title was authorised by section 1 of, and the first schedule to, the Short Titles Act 1896 (59 & 60 Vict. c. 14). Due to the repeal of those provisions it is now authorised by section 19(2) of the Interpretation Act 1978.)
- Act of Parliament
- Parliament of Great Britain
- Long title: An Act for carrying into Execution a Contract, made pursuant to the Act of Parliament of the 12th of his late Majesty King George 1st, between the Commissioners of his Majesty’s Treasury and the Duke and Duchess of Atholl, the proprietors of the Isle of Man, and their Trustees, for the purchase of the said Island and its dependencies, under certain exceptions therein particularly mentioned.
- Citation: 5 Geo. 3. c. 26
- Territorial extent: Great Britain; Isle of Man

Dates
- Royal assent: 10 May 1765
- Commencement: 10 January 1765 (Note: Start of session.)
- Repealed: 27 May 1976
Other legislation
Amended by	Statute Law Revision Act 1887; Statute Law Revision Act 1888
Repealed by	Statute Law (Repeals) Act 1976
Relates to	Assurance of the Isle of Man Act 1609; Duke of Atholl's Rights, Isle of Man Act 1825

Status: Repealed

Text of statute as originally enacted

The Isle of Man Purchase Act 1765 (5 Geo. 3. c. 26), also known as the Act of Revestment, was an act of the Parliament of Great Britain that purchased the feudal rights of the Dukes of Atholl as Lords of Man over the Isle of Man, and revested them into the British Crown.

The Assurance of the Isle of Man Act 1609 (7 Jas. 1. c. 4) conferred the feudal rights over the island upon the Duchess of Atholl's ancestor William Stanley, 6th Earl of Derby and his heirs, meaning that a further act of Parliament was required to terminate those rights.

The act gave effect to an earlier contract between Charlotte, Duchess of Atholl, and the government of the Kingdom of Great Britain, represented by HM Treasury, to sell the Atholls' feudal rights over the Island to the Crown for a sum of £70,000. The authority to conclude a contract for the purchase was given under sections 25 and 26 of the Customs, etc., Revenues Act 1725 (12 Geo. 1. c. 28), which was passed in 1726.

The act came into force upon the granting of royal assent on 10 May 1765. The payment to the Duchess of Atholl was to be made no later than 1 June 1765.

The act did not go as far as had been proposed: for a period there had been plans to merge the Isle of Man into the English county of Cumberland. This had met with fierce resistance from the inhabitants, led by the then Speaker of the House of Keys, Sir George Moore.

The whole act was repealed by section 1(1) of, and part XIV of schedule 1 to, the Statute Law (Repeals) Act 1976, which came into force on 27 May 1976.

== Subsequent rights sold ==
Duke of Atholl's Rights, Isle of Man Act 1825
- Act of Parliament
- Parliament of the United Kingdom
- Long title: An act to empower the Commissioners of His Majesty's Treasury to purchase a certain Annuity in respect of Duties of Customs levied in the Isle of Man, and reserved Sovereign Rights in the said Island, belonging to John Duke of Atholl.
- Citation: 6 Geo. 4. c. 34
- Territorial extent: United Kingdom; Isle of Man

Dates
- Royal assent: 10 June 1825
- Commencement: 10 June 1825 (Note: The Acts of Parliament (Commencement) Act 1793.)
- Repealed: 5 August 1873
Other legislation
Repealed by	Statute Law Revision Act 1873
Relates to	Isle of Man Purchase Act 1765

Status: Repealed

Text of statute as originally enacted

Under the 1765 act, the Atholls still retained their manorial rights, the patronage of the bishopric, and certain other perquisites.

These were sold in 1828 for the sum of £417,144 (over £20,000,000 in modern terms)., which was further accomplished by the Duke of Atholl's Rights, Isle of Man Act 1825 (6 Geo. 4. c. 34).

== See also ==
- History of the Isle of Man – Revestment
