= Douglas Central =

House of Keys constituency

Douglas Central is a House of Keys constituency in the east of the Isle of Man. It was created for the 2016 general election and elects 2 MHKs.

== Elections ==
General election 2021: Douglas Central
Party	Candidate	Votes	%
Independent	Ann Corlett	1,400	34.7
Independent	Chris Thomas	1,319	32.7
Independent	Damien Vincenzo Ciappelli	951	23.5
Independent	Sara Dawn Andrea Hackman	369	9.1
Total votes		4,039	
Total ballots		2,282	
Rejected ballots		7	
Turnout		2,289	43
Registered electors		5,327	

General election 2016: Douglas Central
Party	Candidate	Votes	%
Independent	Chris Thomas	1,571	37.3
Independent	Ann Corlett	1,031	24.5
Independent	Kurt Buchholz	632	15.0
Independent	John Richard George Falk	540	12.8
Independent	Sara Dawn Andrea Hackman	342	8.1
Independent	Michelle Kim Inglis	95	2.3
Total votes		4,211	
Total ballots		2,369	
Rejected ballots		8	
Turnout		2,377	48.6
Registered electors		4,890	
