= Act of Settlement 1704 =

The Act of Settlement 1704 (sometimes cited as 1703) was an Act of Tynwald passed clarifying the status of the population of the Isle of Man. It has been referred to as a Manx Magna Carta as its aim was to preserve the rights of the peasants in relation to their Lord.

In the 16th century, tenants on the Isle had begun to consider their estates as their own but at the end of that century restrictions began to be enforced. An ordinance in 1582 stated that lands were not to be alienated (bought and sold, or left in wills) except by the Lord's license, which came with a fine. This was repealed in 1608 but reimposed in 1645. This situation was not popular among tenants who found themselves losing rights they had previously considered their own. By the last quarter of the century alienation fines were being successfully imposed. These fines made it difficult for tenants to get by and many had to abandon their land.

This situation could not continue and in 1703 Bishop Wilson travelled to speak with the Earl on behalf of the tenants with a view to settling the issue. The Earl agreed to restore to his tenants their ancestral estates and impose significantly smaller fines (a third of the previous levels) and, in the case of inheritance, to allow a year for these fines to be paid. The Act was re-enacted in 1777 after revestment, and is today considered the foundation of the Island's constitution.

== Sources ==
- Official text of the Act of Settlement 1704, as in force today, Isle of Man Legislation
- Full Text of the Act
- Book 7 of AW Moore's History of the Isle of Man
