= Manx Care =

Healthcare service on the Isle of Man

Manx Care was established in April 2021 by the Government of the Isle of Man as an arm's length organisation, established to focus on delivery of health and social care on the Island. This followed a review by Sir Jonathan Michael. The Department of Health and Social Care continues to be responsible for strategy, planning, policy and regulation. Its offices are at Noble's Hospital. Sir Andrew Foster is the chair of the organisation.

It has established a partnership with the Great North Air Ambulance to transfer acutely ill patients. In November 2021, Foster reported a lack of progress with community-based care and the identification of services that would be better delivered off the island and problems with sharing data across different parts of the organisation.

An 18-week referral to treatment target, similar to that in the English NHS, was seen as a considerable challenge according to Lawrie Hooper in February 2022. It is intended to have a three-year mandate with a three-year operational plan, and a three-year budget from the Treasury. The budget in 2022 was £250 million.
