= John Wannenburgh =

Manx politician (died 2026)

John Wannenburgh MHK

Member of the House of Keys for Douglas North
- In office 23 September 2021 – 3 August 2026 Serving with David Ashford

Personal details
- Died: 2 August 2026
- Party: Independent

John Charles Wannenburgh (died 2 August 2026) was a Manx politician who was a Member of the House of Keys for Douglas North from his election in 2021 until his death in 2026.

== Political career ==
Wannenburgh stood for election at the 2021 Manx General Election in which he contested the constituency of Douglas North. He polled 763 votes (21.6% of the vote share) securing one of the two seats available, being second to David Ashford.

During his tenure as an MHK, Wannenburgh served as Chairman of the Manx Utilities Authority.

== Personal life and death ==
Born in Cleethorpes, Lincolnshire, and raised in South Africa, Wannenburgh was educated at Kearsney College and Isle of Man Business School (via John Moores University) gaining a BA (Hons). He served in the South African Navy from 1984–1986.

Prior to his career in politics Wannenburgh was the founder of the Isle of Man Sporting and Dining Club. In this role he hosted dinners attended by numerous celebrities which in turn raised proceeds towards local charities.

Wannenburgh died in his sleep on 2 August 2026.He was survived by his wife Lisa and his three sons.

== See also ==
- List of members of the House of Keys, 2021–2026
