= Carsten Jacobson =

German Army officer

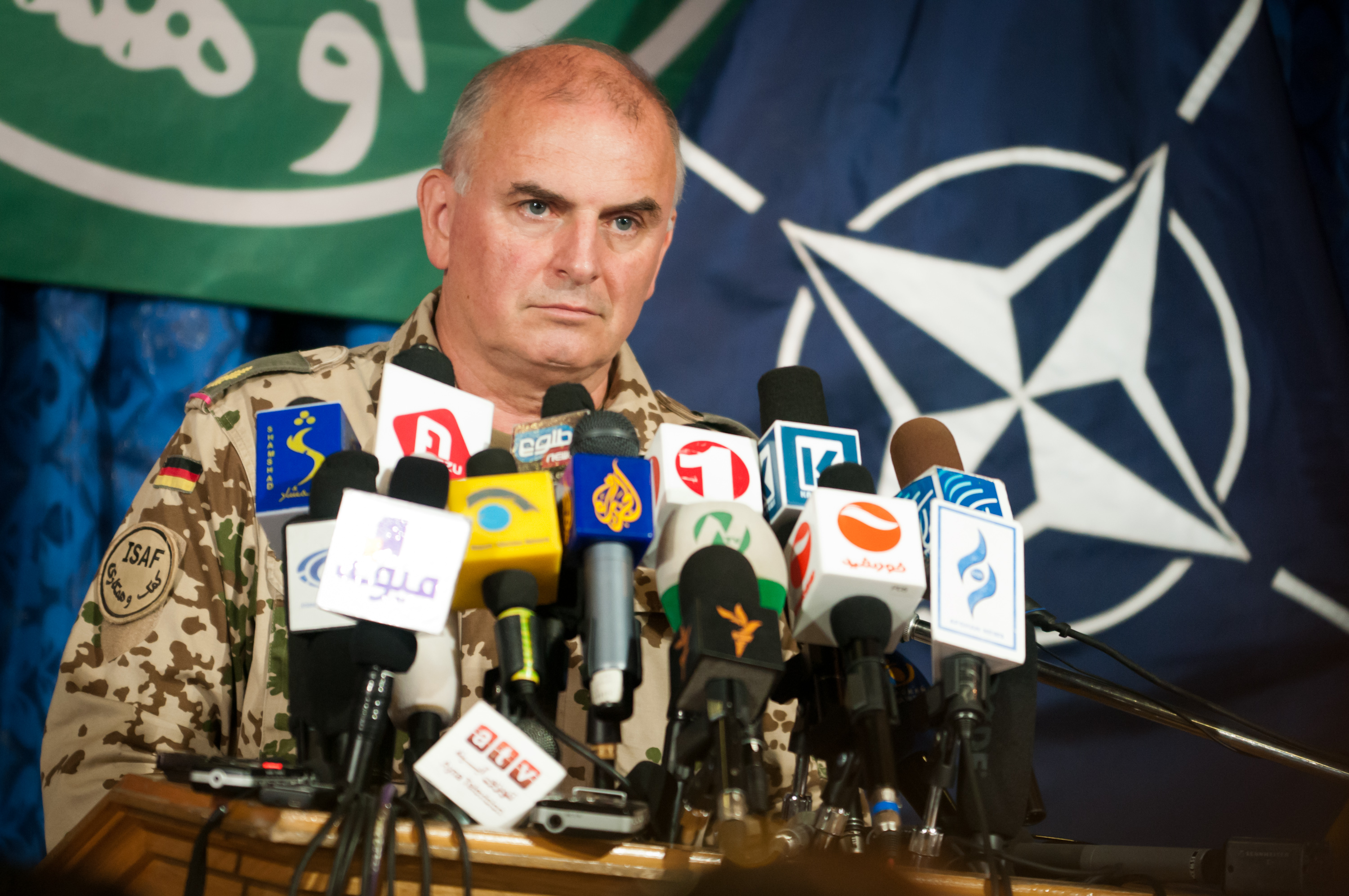
- Carsten Jacobson in Afghanistan, 2012
- Born: 22 June 1955 (age 71)
- Military career
- Allegiance: Germany
- Branch: German Army
- Service years: 1974–2018
- Rank: Lieutenant General
- Conflicts: War in Afghanistan (2001–present)

Lieutenant General Carsten Jacobson (born 22 June 1955 in Hamburg) is a retired German Army officer and Deputy ISAF Commander.

== Military career ==
Jacobson joined the Bundeswehr in 1974 and trained as a tank commander. He attended the German Fuehrungsakademie where he undertook staff officer training from 1986 to 1988.

Jacobson attended the British Army's Staff College, Camberley between 1990 and 1992. He served abroad as part of SFOR in Bosnia and Herzegowina between 1997 and 1998 and then served with KFOR in 1999. He was transferred to the Embassy of Germany, Washington, D.C. in 2001 and served there until 2005. He was transferred to the Allied Rapid Reaction Corps (ARRC) headquarters in Mönchengladbach in 2007. He became Chief of Staff for the German Army Forces Command in 2009 and he became spokesman for ISAF in 2011.

In 2012, he became commander of the 1st Panzer Division and in 2014 he became Deputy Commander of ISAF.

== Honors ==
- Badge of Honour of the Bundeswehr in Bronze (1983), in Silver (1989) and Gold (1994)
- German Armed Forces Service Medal SFOR (1998),
- NATO-Medal (1998)
- Legion of Merit (2005).

== Private life ==
Jacobson has a British wife, Sally Jane (nee McBride), a former Women's Royal Army Corps officer. They married in 1979 and have two sons.
