= 2026 Isle of Man TT =

Annual motorcycle racing event

2026 Isle of Man TT Races
- Isle of Man TT Mountain Course layout

Race details
- Date: 25 May – 6 June 2026
- Location: Douglas, Isle of Man
- Course: Isle of Man TT Mountain Course; 37.733 mi (60.725 km)

The 2026 Isle of Man TT was held between 25 May and 6 June on the Isle of Man TT Mountain Course.

This year's Isle of Man TT introduced the Sportbike TT category following the FIM's introduction in the Superbike ladder as a successor to the prior SuperTwin TT. Bikes from the prior SuperTwin category remained eligible for the new class, as did Formula TT when Superbike TT was introduced in 2005. Race organisers tried to reduce the performance of the Sidecar TT machines with the mandatory use of restrictor plates on engine air intakes. This measure was expected to lower top speeds by around 10mph and add 30 seconds to lap times.

The first practice session was halted, when a competitor came off at Parliament Square and injured eight spectators. One rider, Daniel Ingham, died during the third qualifying session after a crash at Doran's Bend. Maria Costello and passenger Shaun Parker were seriously injured in a sidecar crash at the Brandish section on May 26. Costello has to undergo long term treatment after being diagnosed with paralysis of the lower back due to broken vertebrae, multiple broken ribs and a liver laceration among other fractures and lacerations. A decision was announced on 28 May to suspend the sidecar class on safety grounds for the rest of the 2026 event. This followed a crash in qualifying involving the sidecar of Ryan and Callum Crowe at Crosby Leap. Wet weather disrupted much of the schedule during race week. Supersport Race 1 was postponed from 30 May and later cancelled. The Senior TT was brought forward to Friday 5 June from 6 June. On Saturday June 6 the decision was made to call the remaining event early, so the aborted Senior TT was classified with just one lap completed and the leader Dean Harrison given the Senior TT race win.

== Results ==
=== RST Superbike TT Race ===
Results (1–10)
Position	Number	Rider	Machine	Time	Speed (mph)
1	3	(England) Dean Harrison	Honda	01:43:08.967	131.681
2	10	(England) Peter Hickman	BMW	01:43:24.548	131.350
3	6	(Northern Ireland) Michael Dunlop	Honda	01:43:36.964	131.088
4	7	(Australia) Josh Brookes	Honda	01:44:33.745	129.901
5	1	(England) John McGuinness	Honda	01:44:53.314	129.497
6	12	(England) Ian Hutchinson	BMW	01:45:41.373	128.516
7	4	(England) Jamie Coward	Honda	01:45:42.647	128.490
8	2	(Isle of Man) Nathan Harrison	Honda	01:46:28.271	127.573
9	9	(Republic of Ireland) Mike Browne	Honda	01:46:55.382	127.033
10	16	(Northern Ireland) Paul Jordan	Honda	01:47:15.954	126.627

=== Monster Energy Supersport TT Race 1 ===
Results (1–10)
Position	Number	Rider	Machine	Time	Speed (mph)
1	6	(Northern Ireland) Michael Dunlop	Ducati	53:45.857	126.318
2	3	(England) Dean Harrison	Honda	54:10.327	125.367
3	10	(England) Peter Hickman	Triumph	54:33.833	124.467
4	2	(Northern Ireland) Paul Jordan	Ducati	54:45.406	124.029
5	7	(Australia) Joshua Brookes	Suzuki	55:03.948	123.332
6	13	(England) Dominic Herbertson	Triumph	55:10.708	123.081
7	4	(England) Jamie Coward	Honda	55:16.744	122.857
8	14	(Northern Ireland) Shaun Anderson	Suzuki	55:17.040	122.846
9	12	(England) Ian Hutchinson	Ducati	55:19.341	122.760
10	1	(Republic of Ireland) Mike Browne	Yamaha	55:25.500	122.533

=== Monster Energy Supersport TT Race 2 ===
Results (1–10)
Position	Number	Rider	Machine	Time	Speed (mph)
1	6	(Northern Ireland) Michael Dunlop	Ducati	53:11.722	127.669
2	3	(England) Dean Harrison	Honda	53:37.849	126.632
3	10	(England) Peter Hickman	Triumph	53:51.386	126.102
4	1	(Republic of Ireland) Mike Browne	Yamaha	54:10.803	125.349
5	2	(Northern Ireland) Paul Jordan	Ducati	54:11.731	125.313
6	7	(Australia) Josh Brookes	Suzuki	54:13.396	125.249
7	13	(England) Dominic Herbertson	Triumph	54:31.073	124.572
8	4	(England) Jamie Coward	Honda	54:46.844	123.974
9	14	(Northern Ireland) Shaun Anderson	Suzuki	54:51.820	123.787
10	12	(England) Ian Hutchinson	Ducati	55:05.033	123.292

=== Carole Nash Sportbike TT Race 1 ===
Results (1–10)
Position	Number	Rider	Machine	Time	Speed (mph)
1	6	(Northern Ireland) Michael Dunlop	Paton	36:29.328	124.082
2	1	(Republic of Ireland) Mike Browne	Paton	36:58.103	122.472
3	2	(Northern Ireland) Paul Jordan	Aprilia	36:58.767	122.436
4	10	(England) Peter Hickman	Yamaha	37:26.382	120.930
5	4	(England) Jamie Coward	Paton	37:40.420	120.179
6	12	(Isle of Man) Joe Yeardsley	Yamaha	37:57.100	119.299
7	13	(England) Dominic Herbertson	Triumph	38:08.037	118.729
8	7	(England) Baz Furber	Yamaha	38:14.641	118.387
9	18	(Czech Republic) Michal Dokoupil	Aprilia	38:15.960	118.319
10	17	(Republic of Ireland) Michael Sweeney	Aprilia	38:25.586	117.825

=== Milwaukee Senior TT Race ===
Results (1–10)
Position	Number	Rider	Machine	Time	Speed (mph)
1	3	(England) Dean Harrison	Honda	16:44.900	135.166
2	10	(England) Peter Hickman	BMW	16:57.360	133.510
3	7	(Australia) Josh Brookes	Honda	17:02.997	132.775
4	12	(England) Ian Hutchinson	BMW	17:10.643	131.789
5	6	(Northern Ireland) Michael Dunlop	Honda	17:14.045	131.356
6	4	(England) Jamie Coward	Honda	17:24.789	130.005
7	5	(Australia) David Johnson	Kawasaki	17:25.689	129.893
8	2	(Isle of Man) Nathan Harrison	Honda	17:27.178	129.709
9	9	(Republic of Ireland) Mike Browne	Honda	17:27.428	129.678
10	11	(Isle of Man) Conor Cummins	BMW	17:27.479	129.671

== Wins table ==
Rider	Wins
(Northern Ireland) Michael Dunlop	3
(England) Dean Harrison	2

== Bibliography ==
"Island Racer 2026: Ultimate Guide to the 2026 Isle of Man TT". Island Racer. Horncastle: Mortons Media Group. 2026. SKU: 6591607 – via Kelsey Publishing.
