= Paul Haddacks =

British Royal Navy admiral (born 1946)

Vice Admiral Sir Paul Haddacks KCB
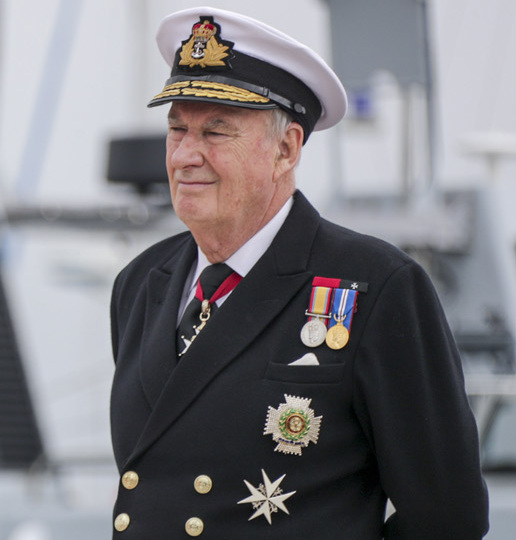
- Haddacks in 2019

28th Lieutenant Governor of the Isle of Man
- In office 17 October 2005 – 1 April 2011
- Monarch: Elizabeth II
- Preceded by: Ian Macfadyen
- Succeeded by: Adam Wood

Personal details
- Born: 27 October 1946 (age 79)
- Spouse(s): Penny, Lady Haddacks
- Children: 1 son
- Education: Britannia Royal Naval College

Military service
- Allegiance: United Kingdom
- Branch/service: Royal Navy
- Years of service: 1964–2004
- Rank: Vice Admiral
- Commands: HMS Intrepid; HMS Naiad; HMS Cleopatra; HMS Scimitar
- Battles/wars: Gulf War
- Awards: Knight Commander of the Order of the Bath

Vice Admiral Sir Paul Kenneth Haddacks, KCB (born 27 October 1946) is a retired senior officer of the Royal Navy who served as Lieutenant Governor of the Isle of Man from 2005 to 2011.

== Early life ==
Haddacks was born on 27 October 1946. He was educated at Kingswood School, in Bath.

== Naval career ==
Having attended the Royal Naval College, Dartmouth, Haddacks joined the Royal Navy in 1964 and specialised in navigation. He commanded successively the frigates HMS Cleopatra and HMS Naiad. He was promoted to lieutenant commander on 1 February 1977, to commander on 31 December 1979, and to captain on 31 December 1984. He went on to be assistant director of Navy Plans in the Ministry of Defence and was later given command of the assault ship HMS Intrepid. He became Senior Naval Officer Middle East and commander of UK maritime forces during Operation Desert Shield in 1990, Assistant Chief of Staff Policy and Requirements Division at Supreme Headquarters Allied Powers Europe in 1994 and UK Military Representative to NATO in 1997. He was appointed Director of the International Military Staff at NATO in 2001 and retired in 2004.

== Later life ==
Haddacks was the Lieutenant Governor of the Isle of Man from 17 October 2005 until 1 April 2011.

== Honours and decorations ==
In the 2000 New Year Honours, Haddacks was appointed Knight Commander of the Order of the Bath (KCB).

He was appointed Honorary Colonel of the Isle of Man Army Cadet Force on 1 November 2005.

Military offices
Preceded by Sir John Cheshire	UK Military Representative to NATO; 1997–2000	Succeeded by Sir Michael Willcocks
Government offices
Preceded by Michael Kerruish (Acting)	Lieutenant Governor of the Isle of Man; 2005–2011	Succeeded by Adam Wood
