= Richard Gozney =

British diplomat (born 1951)

Sir Richard Gozney KCMG CVO KStJ

30th Lieutenant Governor of the Isle of Man
- In office 27 May 2016 – 29 September 2021
- Monarch: Elizabeth II
- Premier: Howard Quayle
- Preceded by: Adam Wood
- Succeeded by: Sir John Lorimer

Governor of Bermuda
- In office 12 December 2007 – 18 May 2012
- Monarch: Elizabeth II
- Premier: Brown, Cox
- Preceded by: John Vereker
- Succeeded by: David Arkley (Acting)

Personal details
- Born: Richard Hugh Turton Gozney; 21 July 1951 (age 74)
- Spouse: Diana Edwina Baird (m. 1982)
- Children: 2
- Education: St Edmund Hall, Oxford

Viceregal styles of Sir Richard Gozney (2016–2021)
- Reference style: His Excellency
- Spoken style: Your Excellency

Sir Richard Hugh Turton Gozney KCMG CVO KStJ (born 21 July 1951) is a British career diplomat who served as governor and commander in chief of Bermuda from 2007 to 2012, and as the Lieutenant Governor of the Isle of Man from 2016 to 2021.

== Early life and education ==
Richard Hugh Turton Gozney graduated from St Edmund Hall, Oxford in 1973 with a bachelor's degree in geology. and was educated at Magdalen College School. Gozney joined the Foreign and Commonwealth Office in 1973. He married Diana Edwina Baird in 1982, and has two sons.

== Career ==
Gozney became Head of Chancery and Political Section in Madrid in 1984, Private Secretary to the Secretary of State for Foreign and Commonwealth Affairs in 1989 and British High Commissioner to Swaziland in 1993. In 1996, he became Head of the Security Policy Department at the Foreign and Commonwealth Office in 1996, Chief of the Assessments Staff at the Cabinet Office in 1998, and British ambassador to Indonesia in 2000. He was British High Commissioner to Nigeria. The Order of St Michael and St George was awarded to him in 2006.

Gozney succeeded John Vereker as Governor of Bermuda on 12 December 2007, and served until 2012. On 27 May 2016, Gozney was sworn in as the 30th Lieutenant Governor of the Isle of Man, succeeding Adam Wood. He served until John Lorimer replaced him on 29 September 2021.

Jeremy Storey was appointed as the island's first full-time Judge of Appeal in 2017. On 16 March 2020, Gozney declared the first state of emergency in the Isle of Man since World War II in response to the COVID-19 pandemic. The state of emergency was lifted on 26 June. His term was scheduled to end in April 2021, but the pandemic resulted in it being extended by six months. In 2022, he was selected to be a member of a £500,000 inquiry into Jersey's management of the pandemic.

== Publication ==
- Gibraltar and the EC: Aspects of the Relationship (Royal Institute of International Affairs Discussion Paper, 1993)

== Works cited ==
- "Coronavirus: Isle of Man state of emergency ends". BBC. 26 June 2020. Archived from the original on 18 June 2025.
- "Departing Lieutenant Governor praises 'island's quiet self-confidence'". BBC. 28 August 2021. Archived from the original on 18 June 2025.
- "Former Isle of Man Lieutenant Governor joins Jersey covid inquiry". Bailiwick Express. 28 March 2022. Archived from the original on 18 June 2025.
- "Isle of Man's first full-time appeal judge sworn in". BBC. 9 October 2017. Archived from the original on 18 June 2025.
- "Sir Richard Gozney: Island's 30th Lieutenant Governor sworn in". BBC. 27 May 2016. Archived from the original on 18 June 2025.
- Johnson, Ayo (23 December 2011). "Governor to leave early next year". The Royal Gazette. Archived from the original on 18 June 2025.
- O'Kelly-Lynch, Ruth (12 December 2007). "New Governor arrives". The Royal Gazette. Archived from the original on 18 June 2025.
- Smith, Tim (13 December 2007). "New Governor sworn in". The Royal Gazette. Archived from the original on 18 June 2025.

Diplomatic posts
Preceded by Stephen Wall	Principal Private Secretary to the Secretary of State for Foreign and Commonwealth Affairs; 1990–1993	Succeeded by John Sawers
Preceded by John Vereker	Governor of Bermuda; 2007–2012	Succeeded by George Fergusson
Government offices
Preceded by Adam Wood	Lieutenant Governor of the Isle of Man; 2016–2021	Succeeded by Sir John Lorimer
