= Adam Wood =

British diplomat

His Excellency Adam Wood CStJ
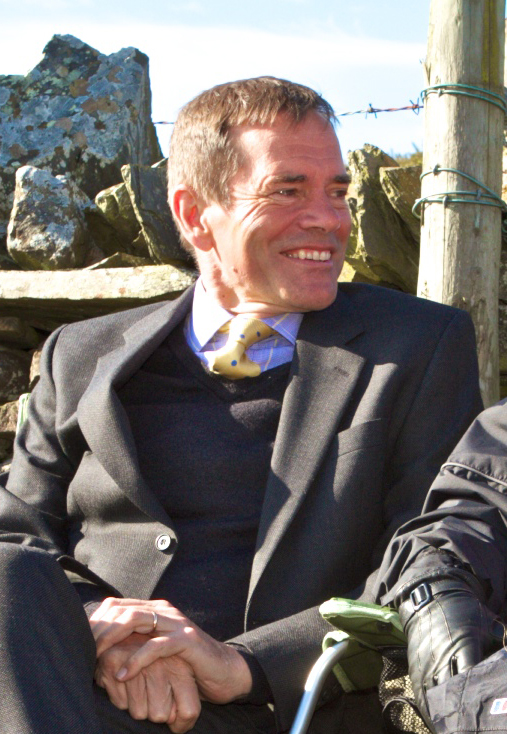
- Wood in April 2012

29th Lieutenant Governor of the Isle of Man
- In office 7 April 2011 – 27 May 2016
- Monarch: Elizabeth II
- Preceded by: Paul Haddacks
- Succeeded by: Sir Richard Gozney

Personal details
- Born: Adam Kenneth Compton Wood; 13 March 1955 (age 71)
- Spouse: Catherine Richardson
- Children: Persie (Persephone)
- Education: Oriel College, Oxford

Viceregal styles of Adam Wood (2011–2016)
- Reference style: His Excellency
- Spoken style: Your Excellency

Adam Kenneth Compton Wood CStJ (born 13 March 1955) is a retired British diplomat, and was the Lieutenant Governor of the Isle of Man from 2011 to 2016.

== Life and career ==
Wood was educated at the Royal Grammar School, High Wycombe and graduated from Oriel College, Oxford in 1977.

Wood's later career consisted of major diplomatic roles in Africa, as the British High Commissioner to Uganda from 2002 to 2005, then High Commissioner to Kenya from 2005 to 2008. Prior to his retirement from the diplomatic service in 2010, he was Africa Director at the Foreign and Commonwealth Office, managing Britain's embassies in Africa.

He was announced as Lieutenant Governor of the Isle of Man in November 2010, and was sworn in on 7 April 2011.

Diplomatic posts
Preceded by Michael Cook	British High Commissioner to Uganda; 2002–2005	Succeeded by Francois Gordon
Preceded by Edward Clay	British High Commissioner to Kenya; 2005–2008	Succeeded by Robert Macaire
Government offices
Preceded by Paul Haddacks	Lieutenant Governor of the Isle of Man; 2011–2016	Succeeded by Sir Richard Gozney
