= John Lorimer (British Army officer) =

British Army general

His Excellency Lieutenant General Sir John Lorimer KCB DSO MBE
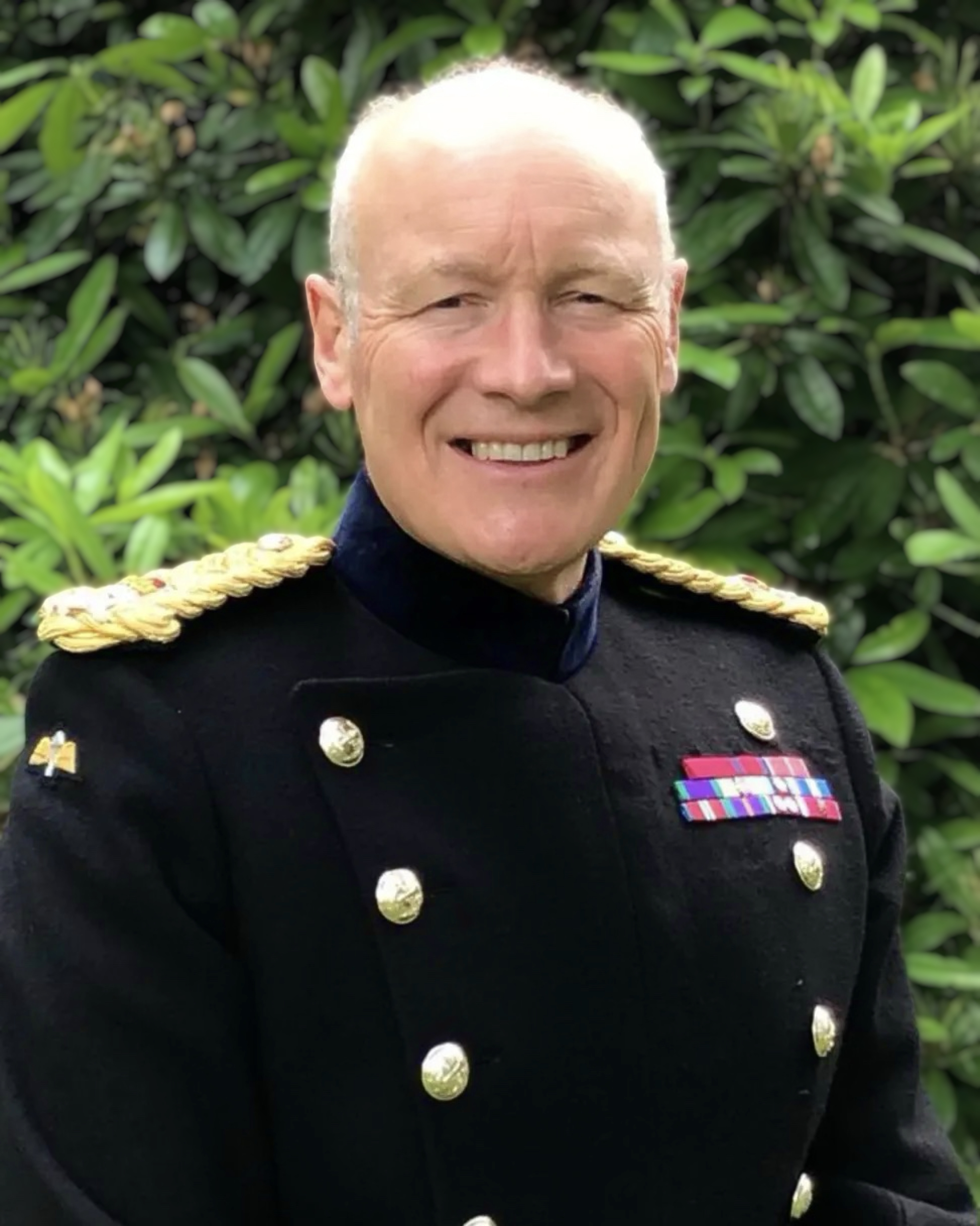
- Lorimer in 2021

Lieutenant Governor of the Isle of Man
- Incumbent
- Assumed office 29 September 2021
- Monarchs: Elizabeth II; Charles III
- Premier: Howard Quayle; Alfred Cannan
- Preceded by: Sir Richard Gozney

Personal details
- Born: 1962 (age 63–64)
- Education: Pembroke College, Cambridge

Military service
- Allegiance: United Kingdom
- Branch/service: British Army
- Years of service: 1981–2021
- Rank: Lieutenant General
- Commands: Chief of Joint Operations (2014–2017); Deputy Commander International Security Assistance Force (2013–2014); 3rd (United Kingdom) Division (2011–2013); Task Force Helmand (2007); 12th Mechanized Brigade (2005–2007); 3rd Battalion, The Parachute Regiment (2000–2003)
- Battles/wars: The Troubles; Iraq War; War in Afghanistan
- Awards: Knight Commander of the Order of the Bath; Distinguished Service Order; Member of the Order of the British Empire

Sir John Gordon Lorimer (born 1962) is a retired senior British Army officer, who served as the Chief of Joint Operations and the Defence Senior Adviser to the Middle East and North Africa. He was appointed Lieutenant Governor of the Isle of Man on 29 September 2021.

== Early life ==
The son of Lieutenant Colonel Gordon Lorimer, John Gordon Lorimer was born in 1962. He was educated at Marlborough College, a private school in Marlborough, Wiltshire, from 1976 to 1981. He studied Arabic and Islamic Studies at Pembroke College, Cambridge.

== Military career ==
Lorimer enlisted as a private soldier in 1981. He was commissioned into The Parachute Regiment on 11 December 1982. He was promoted to lieutenant on 11 December 1984, to captain on 11 December 1988 and to major on 30 September 1994. After serving on operations in Northern Ireland, he was promoted to lieutenant colonel on 30 June 1999 and commanded the 3rd Battalion, The Parachute Regiment from 2000 to 2003, including operational deployments in Northern Ireland and Iraq.

Lorimer was promoted to colonel on 30 June 2003. He was then appointed Commander of 12th Mechanized Brigade in June 2005 and joined his brigade in Iraq later that year. In September 2005, Lorimer commanded the operation that freed two Special Forces soldiers, who were being held hostage in a Basra police station. Promoted to brigadier on 31 December 2005, he was deployed to Afghanistan as commander of Task Force Helmand in April 2007.

Promoted to major general on 23 November 2010, Lorimer was appointed as the Chief of the Defence Staff's Strategic Communications Officer and the Ministry of Defence's Operational Spokesman. He was appointed General Officer Commanding 3rd (UK) Mechanised Division on 6 June 2011. Promoted to lieutenant general on 9 July 2013, he was appointed Deputy Commander, International Security Assistance Force (ISAF), taking over from Lieutenant General Nick Carter.

Lorimer handed over his responsibilities of Deputy ISAF Commander to Lieutenant General Carsten Jacobson (Germany) in June 2014 and became Chief of Joint Operations in October 2014. In January 2016, The Times newspaper listed Lorimer amongst Britain's 500 most influential role models.

Lorimer took over as the Defence Senior Adviser to the Middle East in January 2018, before handing over the role in February 2021. Lorimer is a former Colonel Commandant of the Parachute Regiment and President of the Army Rugby Union. He retired from the British Army on 18 August 2021.

== Lieutenant Governor of the Isle of Man ==
In July 2021, it was announced that Lorimer would be the next Lieutenant Governor of the Isle of Man, succeeding Sir Richard Gozney. He was sworn in as the 31st lieutenant governor during a ceremony held at Castle Rushen in Castletown, Isle of Man, on 29 September 2021.

== Decorations ==
Lorimer was appointed Member of the Order of the British Empire (MBE) in the 1997 Birthday Honours. He was appointed Companion of the Distinguished Service Order (DSO) on 7 March 2008 for service in Afghanistan the previous year. He was appointed Knight Commander of the Order of the Bath (KCB) in the 2016 Birthday Honours. He was granted permission to wear the United States' Legion of Merit in the Degree of Officer, awarded to him "in recognition of meritorious, gallant and distinguished services during coalition operations in Afghanistan", in April 2017.

Military offices
Preceded by James Everard	General Officer Commanding the 3rd Mechanised Division; 2011–2013	Succeeded by James Cowan
Preceded by Nick Carter	Deputy Commander, ISAF; 2013–2014	Succeeded by Carsten Jacobson
Preceded by Sir David Capewell	Chief of Joint Operations; 2015–2017	Succeeded by Tim Fraser
Government offices
Preceded by Sir Richard Gozney	Lieutenant Governor of the Isle of Man; 2021–Present	Incumbent
