= Alfred Cannan =

Manx politician (born 1968)

The Honourable Alfred Cannan Member of the House of Keys
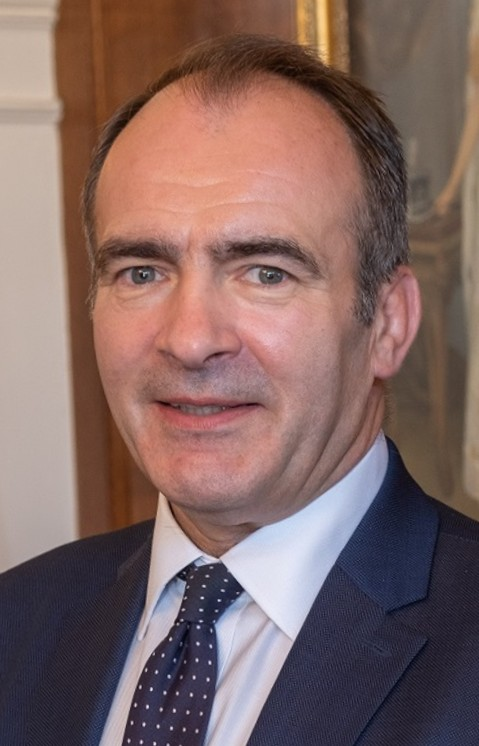
- Cannan in 2023

Chief Minister of the Isle of Man
- In office 12 October 2021 – 13 October 2026
- Monarchs: Elizabeth II; Charles III
- Lieutenant Governor: John Lorimer
- Preceded by: Howard Quayle
- Succeeded by: Chris Thomas

Minister for the Treasury
- In office 4 October 2016 – 12 October 2021
- Chief Minister: Howard Quayle
- Preceded by: Eddie Teare
- Succeeded by: David Ashford

Member of the House of Keys for Ayre and Michael
- Incumbent
- Assumed office 22 September 2016
- Preceded by: Constituency established

Member of the House of Keys for Michael
- In office 29 September 2011 – 21 September 2016
- Succeeded by: Constituency abolished

Personal details
- Born: Alfred Louis Cannan; 20 January 1968 (age 58) Reading, Berkshire, England
- Party: Independent
- Education: King William's College
- Alma mater: Royal Military Academy Sandhurst

Alfred Louis Cannan (born 20 January 1968), Member of the House of Keys (MHK), is a Manx politician and independent Member of the House of Keys for Ayre & Michael. He served as the Chief Minister of the Isle of Man from 2021 to 2026. He was previously the Minister for the Treasury.

Cannan sought the position of Chief Minister in 2016, but was unsuccessful. His nomination was the first ever in which only MHKs had a vote: previously the members of the Legislative Council also took part in the election. Cannan replaced Howard Quayle, who was stepping down from his position and declined to run in the 2021 House of Keys election. On 12 October 2021, Cannan defeated Ramsey MHK Alex Allinson to become the Isle of Man's Chief Minister.

== Political career ==
In 2011, Cannan was elected as MHK for the constituency of Michael, which was abolished in 2016.

Cannan's first government appointment was as chairman of the Civil Service Commission, serving from 2011 to 2014. In 2014 he was appointed chairman of the newly formed Manx Utilities Authority.

From 2015 to 2016 he was also a political member of the Department of Economic Development.

In 2016 he was elected as an MHK for the new constituency of Ayre & Michael, winning the highest number of votes in the two-member constituency.

Cannan was narrowly defeated by Howard Quayle in the election of the Chief Minister, and was appointed Treasury Minister in October 2016. His term of office as Treasury Minister was marked by some significant decisions. In October 2017 Cannan wrote off £95m of debts owed by the Manx Utilities Authority; in February 2018 pension freedoms were controversially introduced; and in May 2018 the Isle of Man Government purchased the Isle of Man Steam Packet Company for £124.3m.

Cannan has been a strong advocate for reform of the National Health Service on the Isle of Man and was instrumental in initiating the review by Sir Jonathan Michael which has led to a proposed separation of policy and operations and the formation of a new delivery organisation named Manx Care.

He maintained that the focus of his budgets must be on "working families" and the challenge of dealing with a decade of low wage growth. His budgets saw significant rises in personal tax allowances alongside targeted above inflation welfare increases for low paid workers as well as child benefit.

In March 2020 Cannan delivered the economic package that was to sustain the Isle of Man through the COVID pandemic which included a salary support scheme and the Manx Earnings Replacement Allowance (MERA). He established a cross government Economic Recovery Group which, amongst a number of initiatives, oversaw the formation of the Manx Development Corporation and launched a major review of the Isle of Man Economic Strategy.

On 12 October 2021 he was elected as Chief Minister of the Isle of Man by the House of Keys. In December 2021 he announced a major shift in the management of Coronavirus and then in March 2022 the Government announced it would support the humanitarian effort in Ukraine by accepting refugees.

Cannan's administration was rocked in October 2024 with the shock resignations of Minister for Health and Social Care Lawrie Hooper and Political Member for the Department of Health and Social Care Joney Faragher, both of whom claimed that Cannan was attempting to privatize Manx health services. This caused backlash from politicians and the public, renewing calls for a no-confidence vote in Cannan as Chief Minister. He had previously faced no-confidence calls in March earlier in the year due to public discontent with the 2024 budget, however he managed to survive this crisis despite a petition for a vote garnering over 1,800 signatures.

== Electoral history ==
=== 2011 ===
2011 Manx general election: Michael
Party	Candidate	Votes	%
Independent	Alfred Cannan	1014	64.06%
Independent	Juan Heavey	244	15.41%
Independent	David Talbot	325	20.53%
Total valid votes		1583	
Rejected ballots		7	0.44%
Registered electors		2,540	
Turnout		3268	62.32%

=== 2016 ===
In 2014, Tynwald approved recommendations from the Boundary Review Commission which saw the reform of the Island's electoral boundaries.

Under the new system, the Island was divided into 12 constituencies based on population, with each area represented by two members of the House of Keys.

As a result the constituencies of Ayre and Michael were merged.

2016 Manx general election: Ayre & Michael
Party	Candidate	Votes	%
Independent	Alfred Cannan	1839	31.35%
Independent	Tim Baker	1572	26.8%
Independent	Carlos Phillips	1358	23.15%
Independent	Louise Whitelegg	638	10.88%
Independent	Alan Kermode	440	7.5%
Liberal Vannin Party	Pat Ayres	39	0.66%
Total valid votes		5886	
Rejected ballots		7	0.22%
Registered electors		4,884	
Turnout		3192	65.36%

=== 2021 ===
2021 general election: Ayre & Michael
Party	Candidate	Votes	
Party	Candidate	Count	Of total (%)
Independent	Alfred Cannan	2,117	36.4
Independent	Tim Johnston	1,203	20.7
Independent	Tim Baker	709	12.2
Liberal Vannin	Paul Weatherall	540	9.3
Independent	Duncan Livingstone	517	8.9
Independent	Phil Corkill	378	6.5
Independent	Dr Sos Boussougou	189	3.2
Independent	Madeleine Westall	168	2.9
Total votes		5,821	
Total ballots			
Rejected ballots			
Turnout			
Registered electors		5,127	

== Personal life ==
Cannan was born in Reading, Berkshire, England, in 1968 and educated at King William's College, Isle of Man, and Sandhurst before undertaking a short service commission with the Royal Regiment of Wales.

Since 2026, he has been in a relationship with former Glenfaba and Peel MHK, Kate Lord-Brennan.
