= Howard Quayle =

Manx politician (born 1967)

The Honourable Howard Quayle CBE
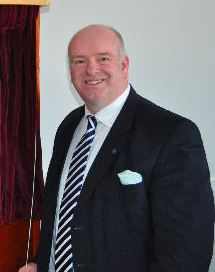
- Quayle in 2015

Chief Minister of the Isle of Man
- In office 4 October 2016 – 12 October 2021
- Monarch: Elizabeth II
- Lieutenant Governor: Richard Gozney; John Lorimer
- Preceded by: Allan Bell
- Succeeded by: Alfred Cannan

Minister for Enterprise
- Incumbent
- Assumed office 20 July 2021
- Preceded by: Laurence Skelly

Minister for Health and Social Care
- In office 31 March 2014 – 4 October 2016
- Preceded by: Himself
- Succeeded by: Kate Costain

Minister for Social Care
- In office 3 March 2014 – 31 March 2014
- Preceded by: Chris Robertshaw
- Succeeded by: Himself as Minister for Health and Social Care

Minister for Health
- In office 3 March 2014 – 31 March 2014
- Preceded by: David Anderson
- Succeeded by: Himself as Minister for Health and Social Care

Member of the House of Keys for Middle
- In office 29 September 2011 – 21 August 2021

Personal details
- Born: Robert Howard Quayle; 1967
- Party: Independent
- Spouse: Lorraine Quayle
- Children: 3

Robert Howard Quayle CBE is the former chief minister for the Isle of Man, between 4 October 2016 and 12 October 2021. He previously served as the minister for Health and Social Care, until the elections in September 2016.

== Early career ==
Quayle began his working life as a civil servant in the treasury and local government planning before moving into the finance sector, working for the NFU Mutual Insurance Group and Clerical Medical.

Eventually, he followed his father into farming and served as vice-president of the Manx National Farmers' Union for two years before taking over as president, from 2005 to 2010.

== Political career ==
In 2011, Quayle was elected to the House of Keys for the constituency of Middle with 41.9% of the vote, unseating incumbent MHK and Minister for Social Care Martyn Quayle. In 2016, he was re-elected as one of the two MHKs for Middle under the revised electoral arrangements. With electors now having two votes each, Quayle increased his number of votes, but he saw his vote share decrease under the new system and failed to top the poll, coming second to Bill Shimmins. Quayle was sworn into the House of Keys on 4 October 2016 and was subsequently elected as Chief Minister by Tynwald.

In May 2021 he stated that he would not seek re-election in the 2021 Manx general election. On 17 September 2021, shortly before the election, he suffered a stroke and was hospitalised for four days.

Quayle was appointed Commander of the Order of the British Empire (CBE) in the 2021 Birthday Honours for services to the people of the Isle of Man.

=== Governmental positions ===
- Chief Minister, 2016–2021
- Minister for Enterprise, 2021
- Minister for Health and Social Care, 2014–2016
- Member of the Department for Economic Development, 2013–2014
- Member of the Manx Electricity Authority, 2013–2014
- Member of the Department of Infrastructure, 2011–2013
- Member of the Economic Policy Review Committee, 2011–2013
- Member of the Planning Committee, 2011–2013

== Election results ==
=== 2011 ===
2011 Manx General Election: Middle
Party	Candidate	Votes	%
Independent	Howard Quayle	922	41.95%
Independent	Paul Craine	560	25.48%
Independent	Martyn Quayle	466	21.2%
Total valid votes		2198	
Rejected ballots		8	0.36%
Registered electors		3,930	
Turnout		2208	56.18%

=== 2016 ===
In 2014, Tynwald approved recommendations from the Boundary Review Commission which saw the reform of the Island's electoral boundaries.

Under the new system, the Island was divided into 12 constituencies based on population, with each area represented by two members of the House of Keys.

As a result, Middle's electoral boundaries were changed significantly and the constituency gained an additional Member of the House of Keys.

2016 Manx General Election: Middle
Party	Candidate	Votes	%
Independent	Bill Shimmins	1357	33.54%
Independent	Howard Quayle	1205	29.78%
Independent	Paul Craine	1090	26.94%
Independent	WIlliam Bowers	394	9.74%
Total valid votes		4046	
Rejected ballots		11	0.48%
Registered electors		4,445	
Turnout		2307	51.9%

== Personal life ==
He is married to Lorraine, with whom he has three children. Quayle has also worked as a farmer and has raised an award-winning herd of pedigree Aberdeen Angus cattle.
