= Lord of Mann =

Head of state of the Isle of Man

- Çhiarn Vannin (Manx)
- Coat of arms of the Isle of Man

Incumbent
- Charles III since 8 September 2022

Details
- Style: His Majesty
- First monarch: George III
- Formed: 1504

The Lord of Mann (Manx: Çhiarn Vannin) is the lord proprietor and head of state of the Isle of Man, currently King Charles III. Before 1504, the title was King of Mann.

== Relationship with the Crown ==
Since 1399, the kings and lords of Mann were vassals of the kings of England who were the ultimate sovereigns of the island. This right of 'lord proprietor' was revested into the Crown by the Isle of Man Purchase Act 1765 for £70,000 and a £2,000 annuity, at which point it became a self-governing British Crown Dependency. King George III became the first British monarch to reign over the Isle of Man as Lord of Mann in 1765. For reasons of culture and tradition, the title Lord of Mann continues to be used. For these reasons, the correct formal usage, as used in the Isle of Man for the loyal toast, is The King, Lord of Mann. The term "the King, Lord of Mann" was also used when Charles III was proclaimed king on the Isle of Man.

Queen Victoria was styled as Lady of Man. The title "lord" was used by Queen Elizabeth II.

The formal Latin style is Dominus Manniae.

== List ==
=== Before 1504 ===
Before 1504, the ruler of the Isle of Man was generally styled king of Mann.

=== 16th century ===
- Thomas Stanley, 2nd Earl of Derby, 1504–1521
- Edward Stanley, 3rd Earl of Derby, 1521–1572
- Henry Stanley, 4th Earl of Derby, 1572–1593
- Ferdinando Stanley, 5th Earl of Derby, 1593–1594

=== Succession dispute (1594–1607) ===
In 1598, a succession dispute between the daughters of Ferdinando and their uncle, William Stanley, 6th Earl of Derby, was heard by the Privy Council. They decided that the right to the Isle of Man belonged solely to Queen Elizabeth I, and the letters patent of 1405 which conferred the lordship of the Isle of Man on the Stanley family were declared null and void as the previous ruler, Henry Percy, 1st Earl of Northumberland, had not been subject to legal attainder, despite his treason, and the 1405 and 1406 letters patent had therefore not taken effect.

The Queen, in consideration of the "many eminent services performed to herself and to her royal predecessors by the honourable and noble House of Stanley", withdrew her right and referred the contending claimants to the decision of the Privy Council as to the best claim of inheritance.

The Privy Council decided "the grant being by letters patent under the Great Seal of England, such right would descend according to the Common Law of England to the heirs general, and not to the heirs male", and the island was therefore awarded to Ferdinando's daughters; whereupon William agreed to purchase their several shares and interests.

=== Interim (1607–1609) ===
Following the resolution of the succession dispute, it was ruled that the daughters of Ferdinando Stanley were the rightful heirs. As the oldest of them would not reach the age of majority until 1609, two temporary Lords of Mann were appointed by James I by letters patent, so that the daughters could benefit from the Island's revenues.

- Henry Howard, 1st Earl of Northampton, 1607–1608
- Robert Cecil, 1st Earl of Salisbury, 1608–1609

Assurance of the Isle of Man Act 1609
- Act of Parliament
- Parliament of England
- Long title: An Acte for the Assuringe and Establishing of the Isle of Manne in the name and blood of William, Earl of Derby.
- Citation: 7 Jas. 1. c. 4 Pr.
- Territorial extent: England and Wales; Isle of Man

Dates
- Royal assent: 23 July 1610
- Commencement: 9 February 1610 (Note: Start of Session.)
- Repealed: 25 July 1991
Other legislation
Repealed by	Statute Law Revision (Isle of Man) Act 1991

Status: Repealed

Text of statute as originally enacted

The original letters patent having been declared void, the Parliament of England in 1609 under James I passed a private act of parliament entitled "An Act for assuring and establishing the Isle of Man in the name and blood of William, Earl of Derby", the Assurance of the Isle of Man Act 1609 (7 Jas. 1. c. 4 Pr.) which established the title in law as Lord of Mann. The lordship was conferred by letters patent dated 7 July 1609 upon William. Subsequent succession was under the terms of this grant.

=== 17th and 18th centuries ===
- William Stanley, 6th Earl of Derby, 1609–1612
- Elizabeth de Vere, Countess of Derby, 1612–1627
- James Stanley, 7th Earl of Derby, 1627–1651 (known as the Great Stanley)
- Thomas Fairfax, 3rd Lord Fairfax of Cameron, 1651–1660 (appointed by Oliver Cromwell during the English Interregnum)
- Charles Stanley, 8th Earl of Derby, 1660–1672 (restored by King Charles II)
- William Richard George Stanley, 9th Earl of Derby, 1672–1702
- James Stanley, 10th Earl of Derby, 1702–1736
- James Murray, 2nd Duke of Atholl, 1736–1764
- Charlotte, Duchess of Atholl and John Murray, 3rd Duke of Atholl, 1764–1765

In 1736, on the death of James Stanley, 10th Earl of Derby, the Duke of Atholl, a maternal grandson of James Stanley, 7th Earl of Derby, succeeded to the sovereignty of the Isle of Man, while a more distant cousin succeeded as Earl of Derby.

=== Revestment ===
In 1765, Charlotte, Duchess of Atholl, 8th Baroness Strange, sold the suzerainty of the island to the British government for £70,000 and an annuity of £2,000 (£5,235,000 and £150,000 respectively in modern terms). By the passage of the Isle of Man Purchase Act 1765, the title of Lord of Mann was revested into the British Crown. It has therefore since been used in the Isle of Man to refer to the reigning British monarch.

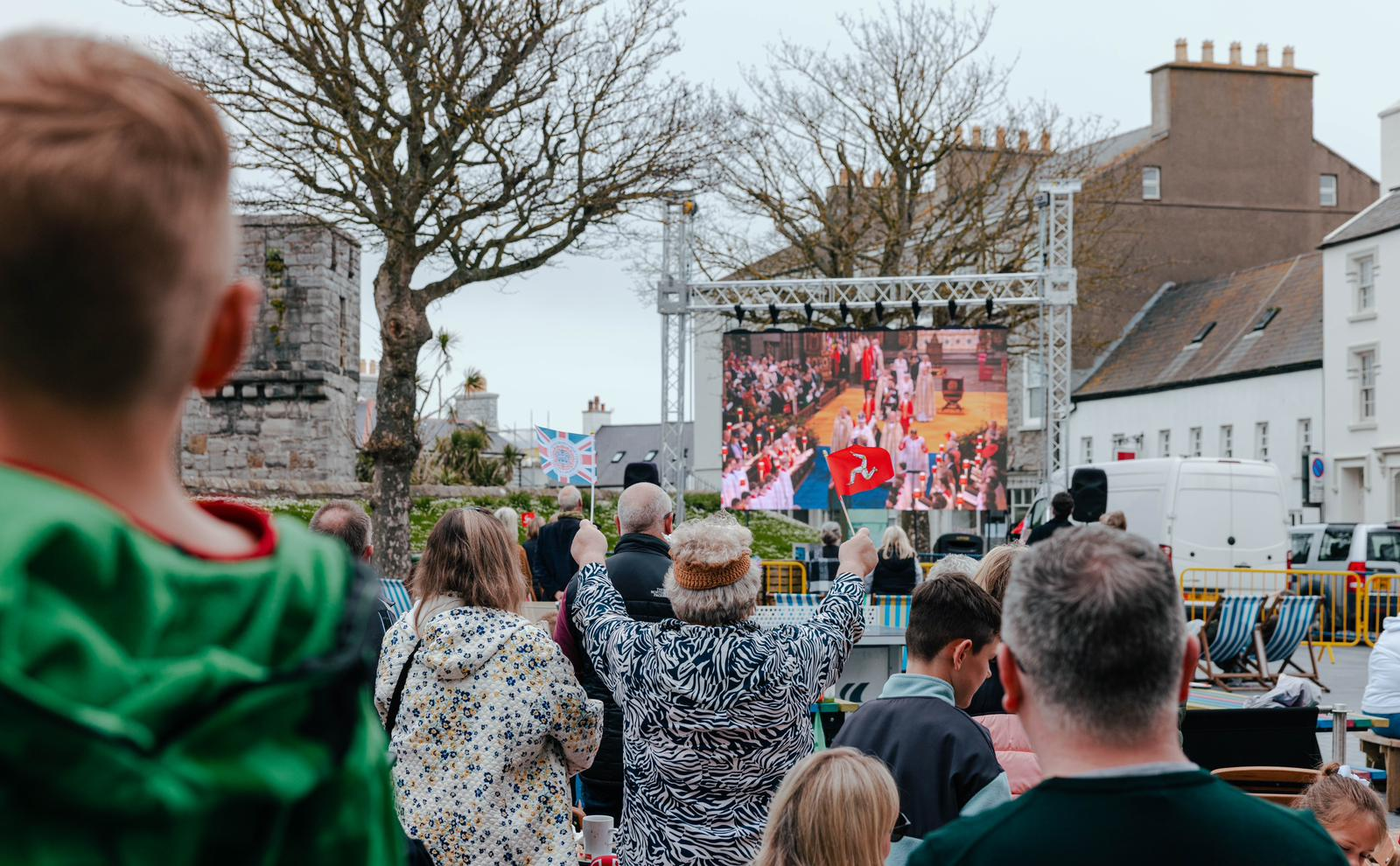
Crowds in Castletown watch the coronation of Charles III; a woman waves the Flag of the Isle of Man.

- George III, 1765–1820
- George IV, 1820–1830
- William IV, 1830–1837
- Victoria, 1837–1901
- Edward VII, 1901–1910
- George V, 1910–1936
- Edward VIII, 1936
- George VI, 1936–1952
- Elizabeth II, 1952–2022
- Charles III, since 2022

In 1828, all remaining property interests and rights of the Dukes of Atholl on the island were sold to HM Treasury, a department of the British government, for the sum of £417,144, equivalent to £39,214,876 in 2025. This was accomplished by the Duke of Atholl's Rights, Isle of Man Act 1825 (6 Geo. 4. c. 34).

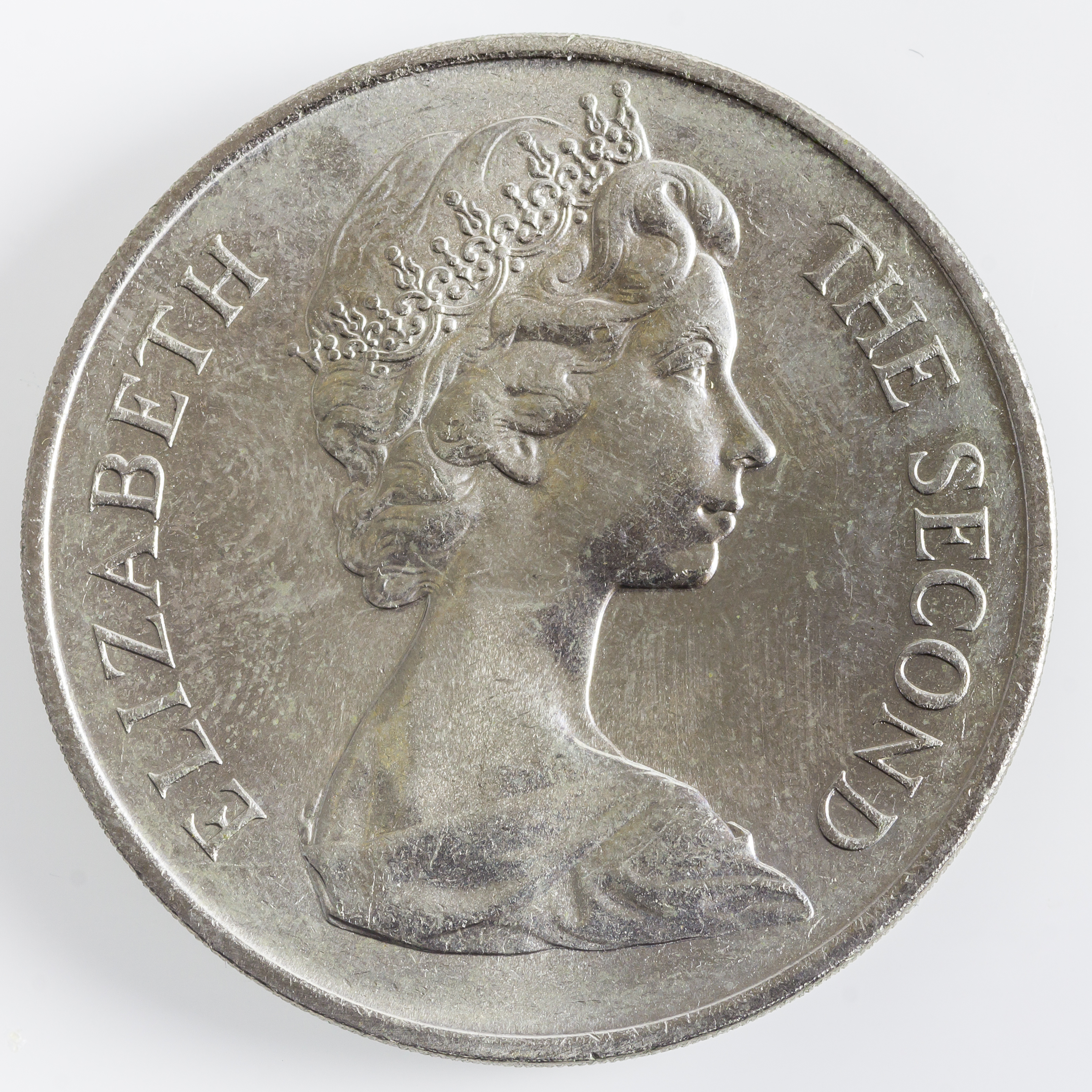
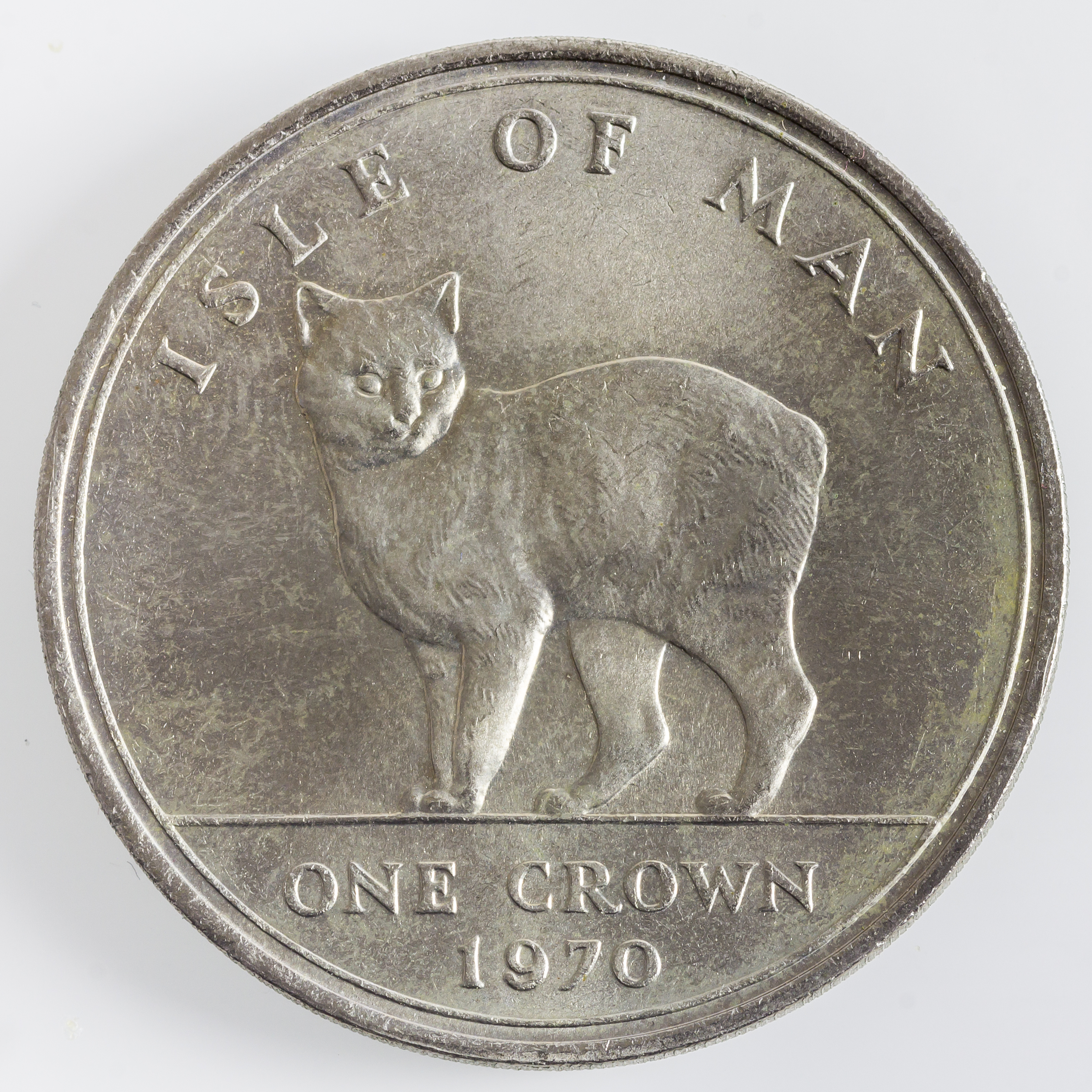
Queen Elizabeth II on a Manx crown coin of 1970. A Manx cat is shown on the reverse.

== Lieutenant governor ==
The Lord of Mann is now represented by the Lieutenant Governor of the Isle of Man.

== See also ==
- Governor of the Isle of Man
- History of the Isle of Man
- Isle of Man Purchase Act 1765
- Lieutenant Governor of the Isle of Man
- Noble and royal titles of the Isle of Man
- List of Manx royal consorts
