= History of the Isle of Man =

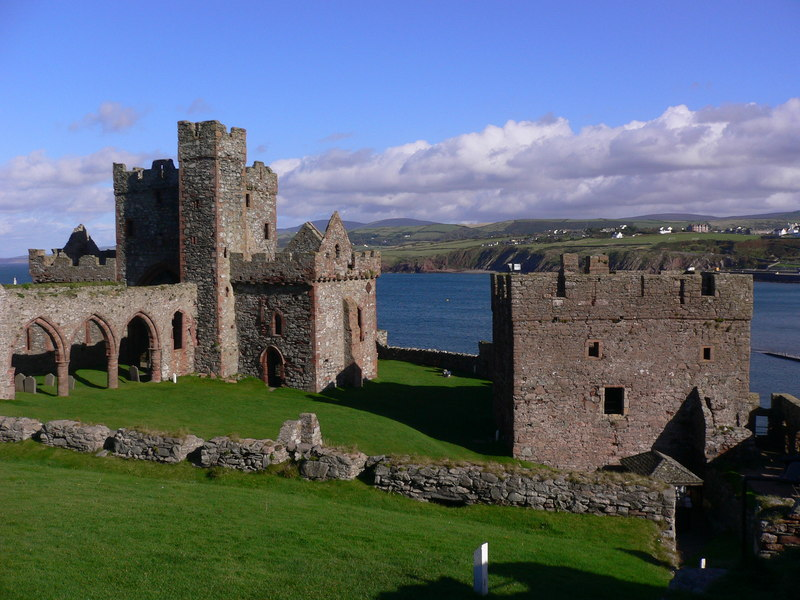
Peel Castle

The Isle of Man had become physically separated from Great Britain and Ireland by 6500 BC. It appears that colonisation took place by sea sometime during the Mesolithic era (about 6500 BC). The island has been visited by various raiders and trading peoples over the years. After being settled by people from Ireland in the first millennium AD, the Isle of Man was converted to Christianity and then suffered raids by Vikings from Norway. After becoming subject to Norwegian suzerainty as part of the Kingdom of Mann and the Isles, the Isle of Man later became a possession of the Scottish and then the English crowns.

Since 1866, the Isle of Man has been a Crown Dependency under democratic self-government.

== Prehistory ==
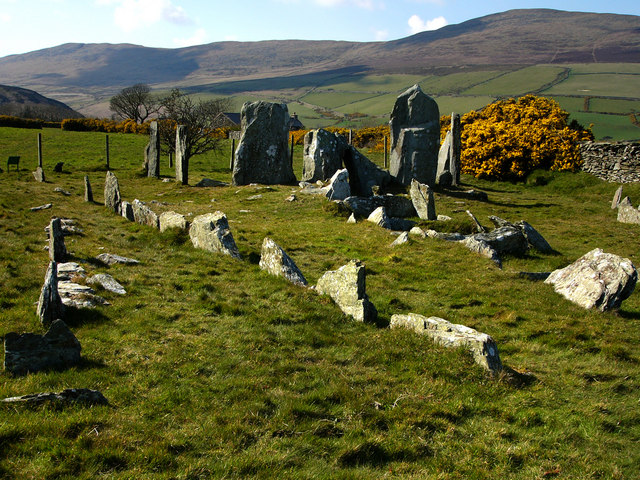
Cashtal yn Ard

The Isle of Man effectively became an island around 8,500 years ago at around the time when rising sea levels caused by the melting glaciers cut Mesolithic Britain off from continental Europe for the last time. There had earlier been a land bridge between the Isle of Man and Cumbria, but the location and opening of the land bridge remain poorly understood.

The earliest traces of people on the Isle of Man date back to the Mesolithic Period (Middle Stone Age, 8000 BC - 4000 BC). The first residents lived in small natural shelters, hunting, gathering and fishing for their food. They used small tools made of flint or bone, examples of which have been found near the coast. Examples of these artifacts are kept at the Manx National Heritage museum.

The Neolithic Period marked the coming of farming, improved stone tools and pottery. During this period megalithic monuments began to appear around the island. Examples are found at Cashtal yn Ard near Maughold, King Orry's Grave in Laxey, Meayll Circle near Cregneash, and Ballaharra Stones in St John's. The builders of the megaliths were not the only culture during this time; there are also remains of the local Ronaldsway culture (lasting from the late Neolithic into the Bronze Age).

In the Iron Age, large hill forts appeared on hill summits and smaller promontory forts along the coastal cliffs, while large timber-framed roundhouses were built.

It is not known if the Romans ever made a landing on the island and if they did, little evidence has been discovered. The sole evidence for Roman presence on the island lies in a single amphora, which was discovered at the settlement on the South Barrule; it is hypothesised this may have been used to trade or plunder goods.

== Middle Ages ==
=== Early Middle Ages ===
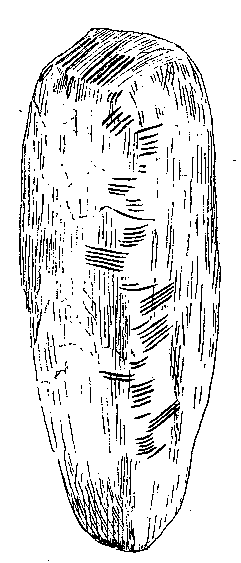
Ogham stone from the Isle of Man. Text reads BIVAIDONAS MAQI MUCOI CUNAVA[LI]; in English: Of Bivaidonas, son of the tribe Cunava[li].

In the late Roman period, there was strong Irish (Gaelic) influence throughout the Irish Sea, as well as Irish raiding and settlement on the west coast of Britain. The Romans referred to these Irish Gaels as Scoti. The Roman historian Orosius wrote in the 5th century that the Isle of Man (Menavia) was inhabited by the Irish. The oldest known language on the Isle of Man was Archaic Irish, which is found on stone inscriptions in the Ogham alphabet, dating to around the 5th century. Ogham stones found in the south of Mann are monolingual Irish (like Ballaqueeney Ogham Stone), while those in the north are bilingual Irish and Latin (like Knock y Doonee Ogham Stone). The Ballaqueeney stone seems to commemorate one of the Conailli, an Irish tribe who lived on the coast of what is now County Louth in Ireland.

The Annals of Ulster record an Irish expedition to the Isle of Man by the Ulaid in AD 577, followed by their withdrawal the following year. The annals say that the Ulaid king Báetán mac Cairill (572–581) had "cleared" the Isle of Man, which could mean that he expelled the Conailli from the island.

It is generally assumed that Irish invasion or immigration formed the basis of the Manx language.

According to Manx tradition, Saint Patrick was responsible for converting the island to Christianity. He is said to have sent Germanus and the Irish missionary Maughold (Macc Cuill) to the island in the 5th century. Muirchú's 7th century Life of Patrick says that when Macc Cuill landed on the island, there were already Christians. Their spiritual leaders were Conindrus and Rumilus, which seem to be Romano-British names. 'Long cist' burials, which are known from almost 100 sites on the island, seem to have arrived with Christianity from Roman Britain. So far, the earliest have been radiocarbon dated to the 4th–5th century; these are at Balladoole and Rushen Abbey. Most of these burials are associated with small early chapels called keeills (from Irish cill); there are more than 200 scattered across the island.

From the 7th century, there is evidence of Celtic Britons on the Isle of Man, and possible Brittonic control over the island. A stone cross found on the northeast coast, dated to the 8th or 9th century, is inscribed Crux Guriat (Guriat's cross). This is a Brittonic name. It probably refers to Gwriad ab Elidyr, father of Merfyn Frych; the latter ruled the Welsh kingdom of Gwynedd from 825 to 844 and founded its second ruling dynasty, the Merfynion. Early medieval Welsh genealogies suggest that Merfyn came from the Isle of Man. In the 8th century, Anglo-Saxon historian Bede wrote that Britons dwelt on the island.

Even if the supposed conquest of Mann by Edwin of Northumbria, in 616, did take place, it could not have led to any permanent results, for when the English were driven from the coasts of Cumberland and Lancashire soon afterwards, they could not well have retained their hold on the island to the west of these coasts. One can speculate, however, that when Ecgfrið's Northumbrians laid Ireland waste from Dublin to Drogheda in 684, they temporarily occupied Mann.

=== Viking Age and Norse kingdom ===
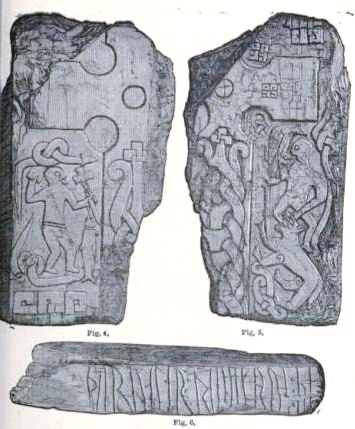
Thorwald's cross slab, including Norse pagan and Christian imagery, as well as Manx runes

The period of Scandinavian domination is divided into two main epochs – before and after the conquest of Mann by Godred Crovan in 1079. Warfare and unsettled rule characterise the earlier epoch, the later saw comparatively more peace.

The Kingdom of Mann and the Isles about the year 1100. Sodor and Mann in red.

Between about AD 800 and 815 the Vikings came to Mann chiefly for plunder. Between about 850 and 990, when they settled, the island fell under the rule of the Scandinavian Kings of Dublin and between 990 and 1079, it became subject to the powerful Earls of Orkney.

There was a mint producing coins on Mann between c. 1025 and c. 1065. These Manx coins were minted from an imported type 2 Hiberno-Norse penny die from Dublin. Hiberno-Norse coins were first minted under Sihtric, King of Dublin. This illustrates that Mann may have been under the thumb of Dublin at this time.

Little is known about the conqueror, Godred Crovan. According to the Chronicon Manniae he subdued Dublin, and a great part of Leinster, and held the Scots in such subjection that supposedly no one who set out to build a vessel dared to insert more than three bolts. The memory of such a ruler would be likely to survive in tradition, and it seems probable therefore that he is the person commemorated in Manx legend under the name of King Gorse or Orry. He created the Kingdom of Mann and the Isles in around 1079 including the south-western islands of Scotland until 1164, when two separate kingdoms were formed from it. In 1154, later known as the Diocese of Sodor and Man, was formed by the Catholic Church.

The islands under his rule were called the Suðr-eyjar (South isles, in contrast to the Norðr-eyjar North isles", i.e. Orkney and Shetland), consisting of the Hebrides, all the smaller western islands of Scotland, and Mann. At a later date his successors took the title of Rex Manniae et Insularum (King of Mann and of the Isles). The kingdom's capital was on St Patrick's Isle, where Peel Castle was built on the site of a Celtic monastery.

Olaf, Godred's son, exercised considerable power and according to the Chronicle, maintained such close alliance with the kings of Ireland and Scotland that no one ventured to disturb the Isles during his time (1113–1152). In 1156 his son Godred (reigned 1153–1158), who for a short period also ruled over Dublin, lost the smaller islands off the coast of Argyll as a result of a quarrel with Somerled (the ruler of Argyll). An independent sovereignty thus appeared between the two divisions of his kingdom.

"In the 1130s the Catholic Church sent a small mission to establish the first bishopric on the Isle of Man, and appointed Wimund as the first bishop. He soon afterwards embarked with a band of followers on a career of murder and looting throughout Scotland and the surrounding islands."

During the whole of the Scandinavian period, the Isles remained nominally under the suzerainty of the Kings of Norway but the Norwegians only occasionally asserted it with any vigour. The first such king to assert control over the region was likely Magnus Barelegs, at the turn of the 12th century. It was not until Hakon Hakonarson's 1263 expedition that another king returned to the Isles.

=== Decline of Norse rule ===
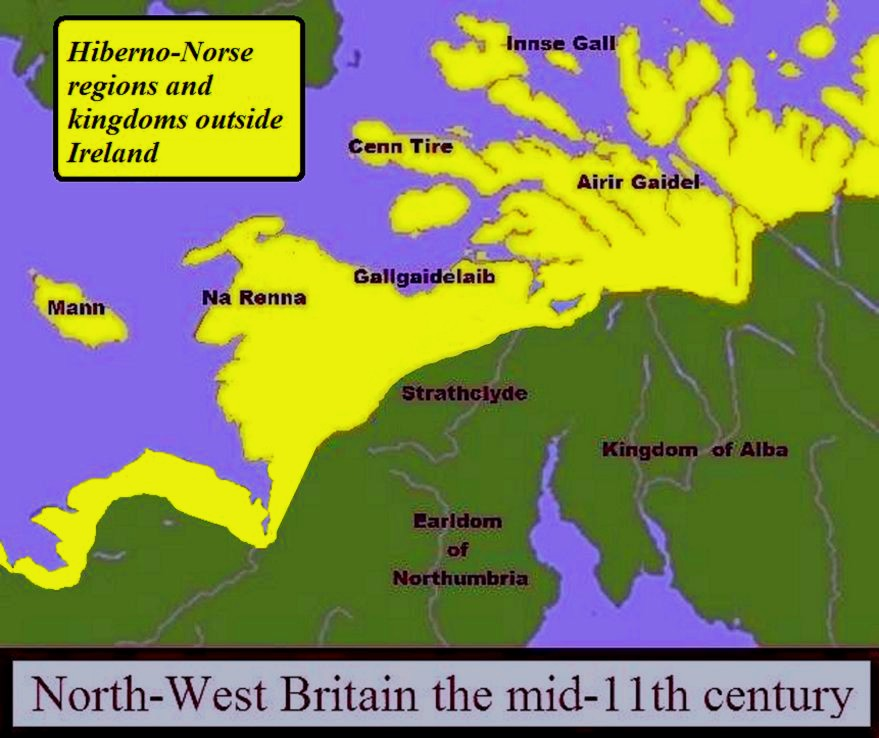
11th century (north is to the right)

From the middle of the 12th century until 1217 the suzerainty had remained of a very shadowy character; Norway had become a prey to civil dissensions. But after that date it became a reality, and Norway consequently came into collision with the growing power of the kingdom of Scotland.

Early in the 13th century, when Ragnald (reigned 1187–1229) paid homage to King John of England (reigned 1199–1216), we hear for the first time of English intervention in the affairs of Mann. But a period of Scots domination would precede the establishment of full English control. Finally, in 1261, Alexander III of Scotland sent envoys to Norway to negotiate for the cession of the isles, but their efforts led to no result. He therefore initiated a war, which ended in the indecisive Battle of Largs against the Norwegian fleet in 1263. However, the Norwegian king Haakon Haakonsson died the following winter, and this allowed King Alexander to bring the war to a successful conclusion. Magnus Olafsson, King of Mann and the Isles (reigned 1252–1265), who had campaigned on the Norwegian side, had to surrender all the islands over which he had ruled, except Mann, for which he did homage. Two years later Magnus died and in 1266 King Magnus VI of Norway ceded the islands, including Mann, to Scotland in the Treaty of Perth in consideration of the sum of 4,000 marks (known as merks in Scotland) and an annuity of 100 marks. But Scotland's rule over Mann did not become firmly established until 1275, when the Manx suffered defeat in the decisive Battle of Ronaldsway, near Castletown.

=== English dominance ===
In 1290 King Edward I of England sent Walter de Huntercombe to seize possession of Mann, and it remained in English hands until 1313, when Robert Bruce took it after besieging Castle Rushen for five weeks. In about 1333 King Edward III of England granted Mann to William de Montacute, 3rd Baron Montacute (later the 1st Earl of Salisbury), as his absolute possession, without reserving any service to be rendered to him.

Then, in 1346, the Battle of Neville's Cross decided the long struggle between England and Scotland in England's favour. King David II of Scotland, Robert Bruce's last male heir, had been captured in the Battle of Neville's Cross and ransomed; however, when Scotland was unable to raise one of the ransom instalments, David made a secret agreement with King Edward III of England to cancel it, in return for transferring the Scottish kingdom to an English prince.

Following the secret agreement, there followed a confused period when Mann sometimes experienced English rule and sometimes Scottish. In 1388 the island was "ravaged" by Sir William Douglas of Nithsdale on his way home from the destruction of the town of Carlingford.

In 1392 William de Montacute's son sold the island, including sovereignty, to Sir William le Scrope. In 1399 Henry Bolinbroke brought about the beheading of Le Scrope, who had taken the side of Richard II when Bolinbroke usurped the throne and appointed himself Henry IV. The island then came into the de facto possession of Henry, who granted it to Henry Percy, 1st Earl of Northumberland; but following the latter's later attainder, Henry IV, in 1405, made a lifetime grant of it, with the patronage of the bishopric, to Sir John Stanley. In 1406 this grant was extended – on a feudatory basis under the English Crown – to Sir John's heirs and assigns, the feudal fee being the service of rendering homage and two falcons to all future Kings of England on their coronations.

== Early Modern period ==
With the accession of the Stanleys to the throne there begins a more settled epoch in Manx history. Though the island's new rulers rarely visited its shores, they placed it under governors, who, in the main, seem to have treated it with the justice of the time. Of the thirteen members of the family who ruled in Mann, the second Sir John Stanley (1414–1432), James, the 7th Earl (1627–1651), and the 10th Earl of the same name (1702–1736) had the most important influence on it. They first curbed the power of the spiritual barons, introduced trial by jury, which superseded trial by battle, and ordered the laws to be written. The second, known as the Great Stanley, and his wife, Charlotte de la Tremoille (or Tremouille), are probably the most striking figures in Manx history.

=== Wars of the Three Kingdoms and Interregnum; 1642 to 1660 ===
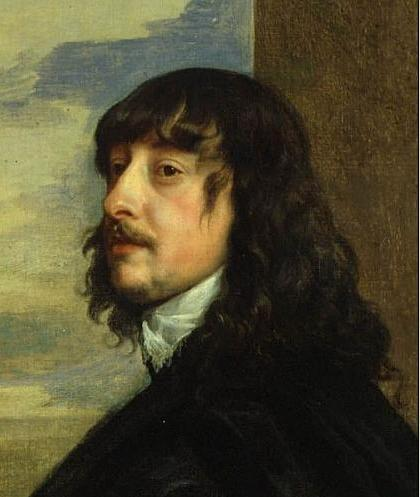
James Stanley, 7th Earl of Derby

In June 1643, shortly after the beginning of the Wars of the Three Kingdoms, James Stanley, 7th Earl of Derby, returned to Mann to find the island on the brink of rebellion. Among the causes were complaints at the level of tithes payable to the Church of England, and Derby's attempts to replace the Manx ‘tenure of straw’ by which many of his tenants held their lands, a customary tenure akin to freehold, with commercial leases. He managed to restore the situation through a series of meetings, but made minimal concessions.

Six months after Charles I was executed on 30 January 1649, Derby received a summons from General Ireton to surrender the island, but declined to do so. In August 1651, he and 300 Manxmen landed in Lancashire to take part in the Third English Civil War; defeated at Wigan Lane on 25 August 1651, Derby escaped with only 30 troops to join Charles II. Captured after the Battle of Worcester in September, he was imprisoned in Chester Castle, tried by court-martial and executed at Bolton on 15 October.

Soon after Stanley's death, the Manx Militia, under the command of William Christian (known by his Manx name of Illiam Dhone), rose against the Countess and captured all the insular forts except Rushen and Peel. They were then joined by a Parliamentarian force sent from the mainland, led by Colonels Thomas Birch and Robert Duckenfield, to whom the Countess surrendered after a brief resistance.

Oliver Cromwell had appointed Thomas Fairfax "Lord of Mann and the Isles" in September 1651, so that Mann continued under a monarchical government and remained in the same relation to England as before.

=== 1660 Restoration ===
The restoration of Stanley government in 1660 therefore caused as little friction and alteration as its temporary cessation had. One of the first acts of the new Lord, Charles Stanley, 8th Earl of Derby, was to order Christian to be tried. He was found guilty and executed. Of the other persons implicated in the rebellion only three were excepted from the general amnesty. But by Order in Council, Charles II pardoned them, and the judges responsible for the sentence on Christian were punished.

Charles Stanley's next act was to dispute the permanency of the tenants' holdings, which they had not at first regarded as being affected by the acceptance of leases, a proceeding which led to an almost open rebellion against his authority and to the neglect of agriculture, in lieu of which the people devoted themselves to the fisheries and to contraband trade.

Charles Stanley, who died in 1672, was succeeded first by his son William Richard George Stanley, 9th Earl of Derby until his death in 1702.

The agrarian question subsided only in 1704, when James Stanley, 10th Earl of Derby, William's brother and successor, largely through the influence of Bishop Wilson, entered into a compact with his tenants, which became embodied in an Act, called the Act of Settlement. Their compact secured the tenants in the possession of their estates in perpetuity subject only to a fixed rent, and a small fine on succession or alienation. From the great importance of this act to the Manx people it has been called their Magna Carta. As time went on, and the value of the estates increased, the rent payable to the Lord became so small in proportion as to be almost nominal, being extinguished by purchase in 1916.

=== Revestment ===
James died in 1736, and the suzerainty of the isle passed to James Murray, 2nd Duke of Atholl, his first cousin and heir general. In 1764 he was succeeded by his only surviving child Charlotte, Baroness Strange, and her husband, John Murray, who (in right of his wife) became Lord of Mann. In about 1720 the contraband trade had greatly increased. In 1726 Parliament had checked it somewhat for a time, but during the last ten years of the Atholl regime (1756–1765) it assumed such proportions that, in the interests of the Imperial revenue, it became necessary to suppress it. With a view to so doing, Parliament passed the Isle of Man Purchase Act 1765 (commonly called the Revestment Act by the Manx), under which it purchased the rights of the Atholls as Lords of Mann, including the customs revenues of the island, for the sum of £70,000 sterling, and granted an annuity to the Duke and Duchess. The Atholls still retained their manorial rights, the patronage of the bishopric, and certain other perquisites, until they sold them for the sum of £417,144 in 1828.

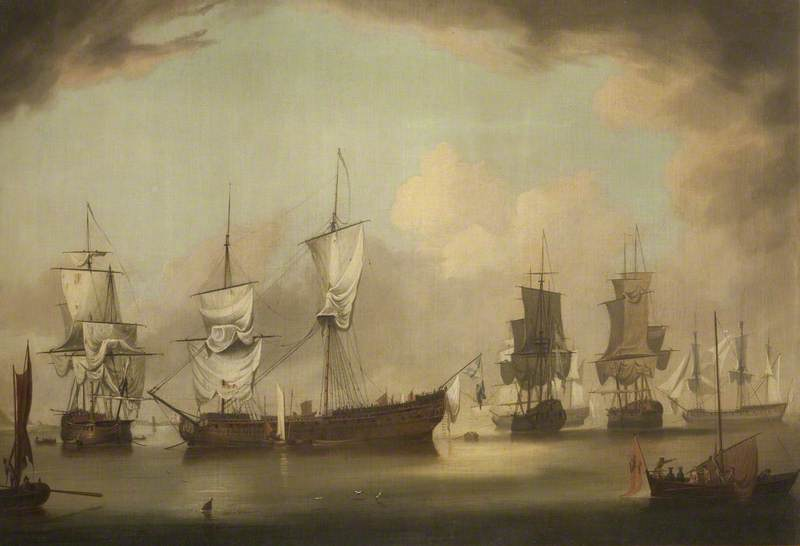
The scene in Ramsey Bay after the Battle of Bishops Court between the English and French squadrons, enacted off the Manx coast in 1760

Up to the time of the revestment‌, Tynwald had passed laws concerning the government of the island in all respects and had control over its finances, subject to the approval of the Lord of Mann. After the revestment, or rather after the passage of the Smuggling Act 1765 (commonly called the Mischief Act by the Manx), the Parliament at Westminster legislated with respect to customs, harbours and merchant shipping, and, in measures of a general character, it occasionally inserted clauses permitting the enforcement in the island of penalties in contravention of the Acts of which they formed part. It also assumed the control of the insular customs duties. Such changes, rather than the transference of the full suzerainty to the King of Great Britain and Ireland, modified the (unwritten) constitution of the Isle of Man. Its ancient laws and tenures remained untouched, but in many ways the revestment affected it adversely. The hereditary Lords of Mann had seldom, if ever, functioned as model rulers, but most of them had taken some personal share in its government, and had interested themselves in the well-being of the inhabitants. But now the whole direction of its affairs became the work of officials who regarded the island as a pestilent nest of smugglers, from which it seemed their duty to extract as much revenue as possible.

There was some alleviation of this state of things between 1793 and 1826, when John Murray, 4th Duke of Atholl served as governor, since, though he quarrelled with the House of Keys and unduly cared for his own pecuniary interests, he did occasionally exert himself to promote the welfare of the island. After his departure the English officials resumed their sway, but they showed more consideration than before. Moreover, since smuggling, which the Isle of Man Purchase Act had only checked – not suppressed – had by that time almost disappeared, and since the Manx revenue had started to produce a large and increasing surplus, the authorities looked more favourably on the Isle of Man, and, thanks to this fact and to the representations of the Manx people to British ministers in 1837, 1844 and 1853, it obtained a somewhat less stringent customs tariff and an occasional dole towards erecting its much neglected public works.

== Modern period ==
Since 1866, when the Isle of Man obtained a nominal measure of Home Rule, the Manx people have made remarkable progress, and currently form a prosperous community, with a thriving offshore financial centre, a tourist industry (albeit smaller than in the past) and a variety of other industries.

The Isle of Man was a base for alien civilian internment camps in both the First World War (1914–1918) and the Second World War (1936–1945). During the First World War there were two camps: one a requisitioned holiday camp in Douglas and the other the purpose-built Knockaloe camp near Peel in the parish of Patrick. During the Second World War there were a number of smaller camps in Douglas, Peel, Port Erin and Ramsey. The (now disbanded) Manx Regiment was raised in 1938 and saw action during the Second World War.

On 2 August 1973, a flash fire killed between 50 and 53 people at the Summerland amusement centre in Douglas.

=== Greater autonomy ===
The early 20th century saw a revival of music and dance, and a limited revival of the Manx language – although the last "native" speaker of Manx Gaelic died in the 1970s. In July 1947 the Taoiseach of the Republic of Ireland, Éamon de Valera, visited, and was so dissatisfied with the lack of support for Manx that he immediately had two recording vans sent over.

During the 20th century the Manx tourist economy declined, as the English and Irish started flying to Spain for package holidays. The Manx Government responded to this by successfully promoting the island, with its low tax rates, as an offshore financial centre, although Man has avoided a place on a 2009 UK blacklist of tax havens. The financial centre has had its detractors who have pointed to the potential for money laundering.

In 1949 an Executive Council, chaired by the Lieutenant-Governor and including members of Tynwald, was established. This marked the start of a transfer of executive power from the unelected Lieutenant-Governor to democratically elected Manx politicians. Finance and the police passed to Manx control between 1958 and 1976. In 1980 a chairman elected by Tynwald replaced the Lieutenant-Governor as Chairman of the Executive Council. Following legislation in 1984, the Executive Council was reconstituted in 1985 to include the chairmen of the eight principal Boards; in 1986 they were given the title of Minister and the chairman was re-titled "Chief Minister". In 1986 Sir Miles Walker CBE became the first Chief Minister of the Isle of Man. In 1990 the Executive Council was renamed the "Council of Ministers".

The 1960s also saw a rise in Manx nationalism, spawning the parties Mec Vannin and the Manx National Party, as well as the now defunct Fo Halloo (literally "Underground"), which mounted a direct-action campaign of spray-painting and attempted house-burning.

On 5 July 1973 control of the postal service passed from the UK General Post Office to the new Isle of Man Post, which began to issue its own postage stamps.

The 1990s and early 21st century have seen a greater recognition of indigenous Manx culture, including the opening of the first Manx-language primary school.

Since 1983 the Isle of Man government has designated more than 300 historic structures as Registered Buildings of the Isle of Man.

== See also ==
- King of Mann (1164–1504)
- List of concentration and internment camps § Isle of Man
- Extinct animals from the Isle of Man
- Registered Buildings of the Isle of Man

== Bibliography ==
- Chiverrell, R. & Thomas, G. (eds.). A New History of the Isle of Man. Liverpool University Press.
  - Chiverrell, Richard; Thomas, Geoffrey (2005). New History of the Isle of Man, Volume 1: The Evolution of the Natural Landscape.
  - Davey, Peter (2010). A New History of the Isle of Man, Volume 2: Prehistory.
  - Duffy, Sean (2005). A New History of the Isle of Man, Volume 3: The Medieval Period, 1000-1406.
  - Belchem, John (2001). A New History of the Isle of Man, Volume 5: The Modern Period, 1830-1999.
- Gawne, C.W. (2009). The Isle of Man and Britain: Controversy, 1651-1895, from Smuggling to the Common Purse. Douglas: Manx Heritage Foundation.
- Gelling, J. (1998). A History of the Manx Church. Douglas: Manx Heritage Foundation.
- Hoy, Michael John (April 2015). Isaac Barrow: Builder of foundations for a modern nation - The church, education and society in the Isle of Man, 1660-1800 (PDF) (PhD). University of Liverpool. Archived from the original (PDF) on 10 October 2016.
- Moore, A. W. (1900). A History of the Isle of Man. London: Fisher Unwin.
- Moore, David W. (2011). The Other British Isles: A History of Shetland, Orkney, the Hebrides, Isle of Man, Anglesey, Scilly, Isle of Wight and the Channel Islands.
