= Geoffrey Somerset, 6th Baron Raglan =

British peer (1932–2025)

The Right Honourable The Lord Raglan
- Predecessor: FitzRoy Somerset, 5th Baron Raglan (brother)
- Successor: Iñigo Arthur Fitzroy Somerset, 7th Baron Raglan (grandson)
- Born: 29 August 1931; Cefn Tilla Court, Monmouthshire, Wales
- Died: 9 September 2025 (aged 93)
- Noble family: House of Beaufort
- Spouse: Caroline Hill (m. 1956; died 2014)
- Issue: Hon. Belinda Caroline Somerset; Hon. Arthur Geoffrey Somerset; Lucy Ann Somerset
- Father: FitzRoy Somerset, 4th Baron Raglan
- Mother: Hon. Julia Hamilton

Geoffrey Somerset, 6th Baron Raglan (29 August 1932 – 9 September 2025), styled the Honourable Geoffrey Somerset until 2010, was a British peer, businessman and Conservative politician.

== Early life ==
Raglan was the younger son of FitzRoy Somerset, 4th Baron Raglan, by his marriage to the Hon. Julia Hamilton, daughter of the 11th Lord Belhaven and Stenton. He was educated at the Dragon School, Oxford, Westminster School, and latterly the Royal Agricultural College.

Raglan's great-great-grandfather, FitzRoy Somerset, 1st Baron Raglan, was the eighth son of Henry Somerset, 5th Duke of Beaufort, so the Lords Raglan are distantly in the line of succession to the Dukedom of Beaufort.

== Career ==
After completing his National Service as an officer in the Grenadier Guards, Raglan was a trainee with the Rootes Group from 1954 to 1957, an instructor at the Standard Motor Company 1957–1960, then sales and later Marketing Manager, Lambourn Engineering 1960–1971. From 1971 to 1994 he was an independent wine importer and from 1994 to 2013 an insurance broker.

He served as President of the Lambourn St John Ambulance Division 1964–1981, President of the Lambourn branch of the Royal British Legion 1963–1977, a member of Berkshire County Council 1966–1975 (Chairman Mental Welfare Sub-Committee, Chairman Children's Homes & Nurseries Sub-Committee, Chairman Children's Homes, Chairman of Governors of Tesdale & Bennet House special schools). He was a member of Newbury District Council from 1979 to 1983 and chaired its Recreation & Amenities Committee, Chairman of the Stanford Conservative Association 1984 to 1988 and again 1997 to 2000, member of the Oxfordshire Valuation Tribunal and later a Chairman of Thames Valley Valuation Tribunals between 1987 and 2004, a member of Oxfordshire County Council 1988–1993, Chairman Vale of White Horse District of the Campaign to Protect Rural England (CPRE) 2000–2004 (and a Committee Member to date). He was also a Trustee of the Public Purpose Charity, Stanford in the Vale, a vice-president of the Oxfordshire Grenadier Guards Association and a Liveryman of the Worshipful Company of Skinners.

== Personal life and death ==
In 1956, Geoffrey Somerset married Caroline Rachel Hill (d. 5 July 2014), the daughter of Colonel Edward Roderick Hill DSO, of St Arvan's Court, Chepstow, Monmouthshire, by his marriage to Rachel Hicks Beach. They had three children, two daughters, and a son, Arthur Geoffrey Somerset (1960–2012), who predeceased his father.

On 24 January 2010, he succeeded his childless older brother, FitzRoy Somerset, as the sixth Baron Raglan. The family seat was Cefntilla Court, Llandenny, in Monmouthshire. Although an inscription over the porch dated 1858 reads: "This house with 238 acres of land was purchased by 1623 of the friends, admirers and comrades in arms of the late Field Marshal Lord Raglan GCB and presented by them to his son and his heirs for ever in a lasting memorial of affectionate regard and respect", Raglan's brother, the fifth Baron, willed Cefntilla to the son of his younger sister, and not to the heirs of the barony. The will was disputed by Arthur Somerset, but following his death in July 2012, the matter was settled.

Geoffrey Somerset died at home on 9 September 2025, at the age of 93. He was succeeded as Lord Raglan by his grandson, Inigo Arthur Fitzroy Somerset (b. 2004), who became the 7th baron.

Peerage of the United Kingdom
Preceded by FitzRoy Somerset	Baron Raglan; 2010–2025	Succeeded by Inigo Arthur Fitzroy Somerset
