= FitzRoy Somerset =

FitzRoy Somerset may refer to:

- FitzRoy Somerset, 1st Baron Raglan (1788–1855), British peer
- FitzRoy Somerset, 4th Baron Raglan (1885–1964), British peer
- FitzRoy Somerset, 5th Baron Raglan (1927–2010), British peer
