= Richard Somerset, 2nd Baron Raglan =

British peer

The Right Honourable The Lord Raglan
- Baron Raglan
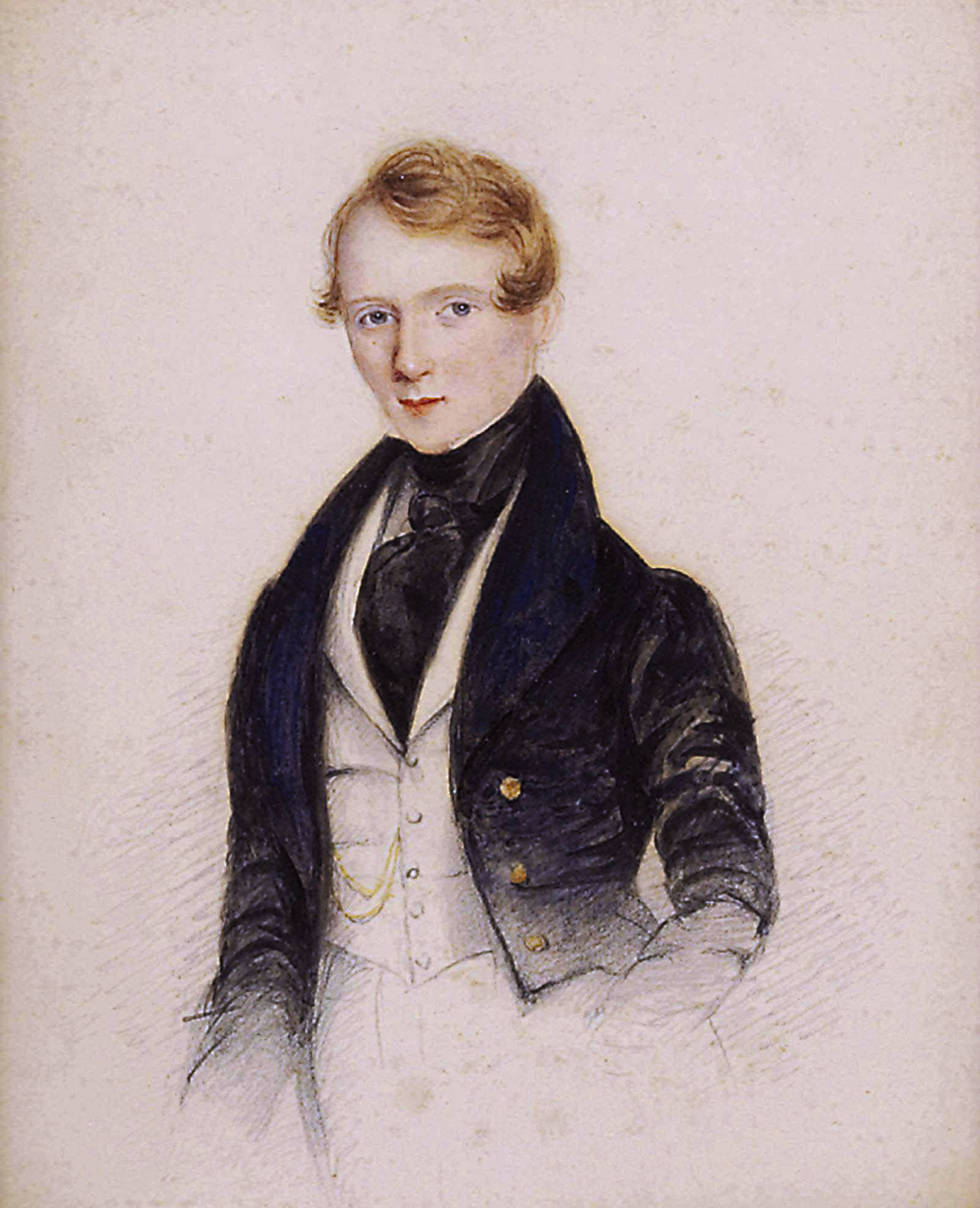
- Richard Somerset, later 2nd Baron Raglan
- Born: 24 May 1817; Paris
- Died: 3 May 1884 (aged 66); London
- Noble family: House of Beaufort
- Spouses: Georgina Lygon; Mary Blanche Farquhar
- Issue: George Somerset, 3rd Baron Raglan; Arthur Charles Edward Somerset; Granville William Richard Somerset; Wellesley Henry Somerset; Richard FitzRoy Somerset; Violet Elizabeth Katharine Somerset
- Father: FitzRoy Somerset, 1st Baron Raglan
- Mother: Emily Harriet Wellesley-Pole

Richard Henry FitzRoy Somerset, 2nd Baron Raglan (24 May 1817 – 3 May 1884) was a British peer.

== Early life ==
Somerset was born in Paris on 24 May 1817. He was the second son of FitzRoy Somerset, 1st Baron Raglan and Lady Emily Wellesley-Pole (daughter of William Wellesley-Pole, 3rd Earl of Mornington, and niece of the Duke of Wellington).

His father was the ninth and youngest son of Henry Somerset, 5th Duke of Beaufort and his wife Elizabeth Boscawen (daughter of Admiral Edward Boscawen).

He was educated at Christ Church, Oxford.

== Career ==
He went to Ceylon with Lt.-Gen. Sir Colin Campbell as his Private Secretary and was subsequently taken into the Ceylon civil service in 1841. In 1844 he was the assistant government agent of Colombo. He left the island in 1849 to become the private secretary of George V of Hanover, leaving that office in 1855 when he succeeded to his father's title. Parliament granted him and his successor a pension of £2,000 for the service of his father (23 July 1855). He was commissioned as a Lieutenant in the disembodied North Hampshire Militia on 31 October 1849, transferring to the Gloucestershire Yeomanry from 1856, initially as a Cornet and then as a Captain 1864–75. He became a Lord-in-waiting from 1858 to 1859 and 1866–69, under The Earl of Derby's and Disraeli's governments respectively.

The family seat is Cefntilla Court in Llandenny, Monmouthshire. An inscription over the porch dated 1858 reads: "This house with 238 acres of land was purchased by 1623 of the friends, admirers and comrades in arms of the late Field Marshal Lord Raglan GCB and presented by them to his son and his heirs for ever in a lasting memorial of affectionate regard and respect".

== Personal life ==
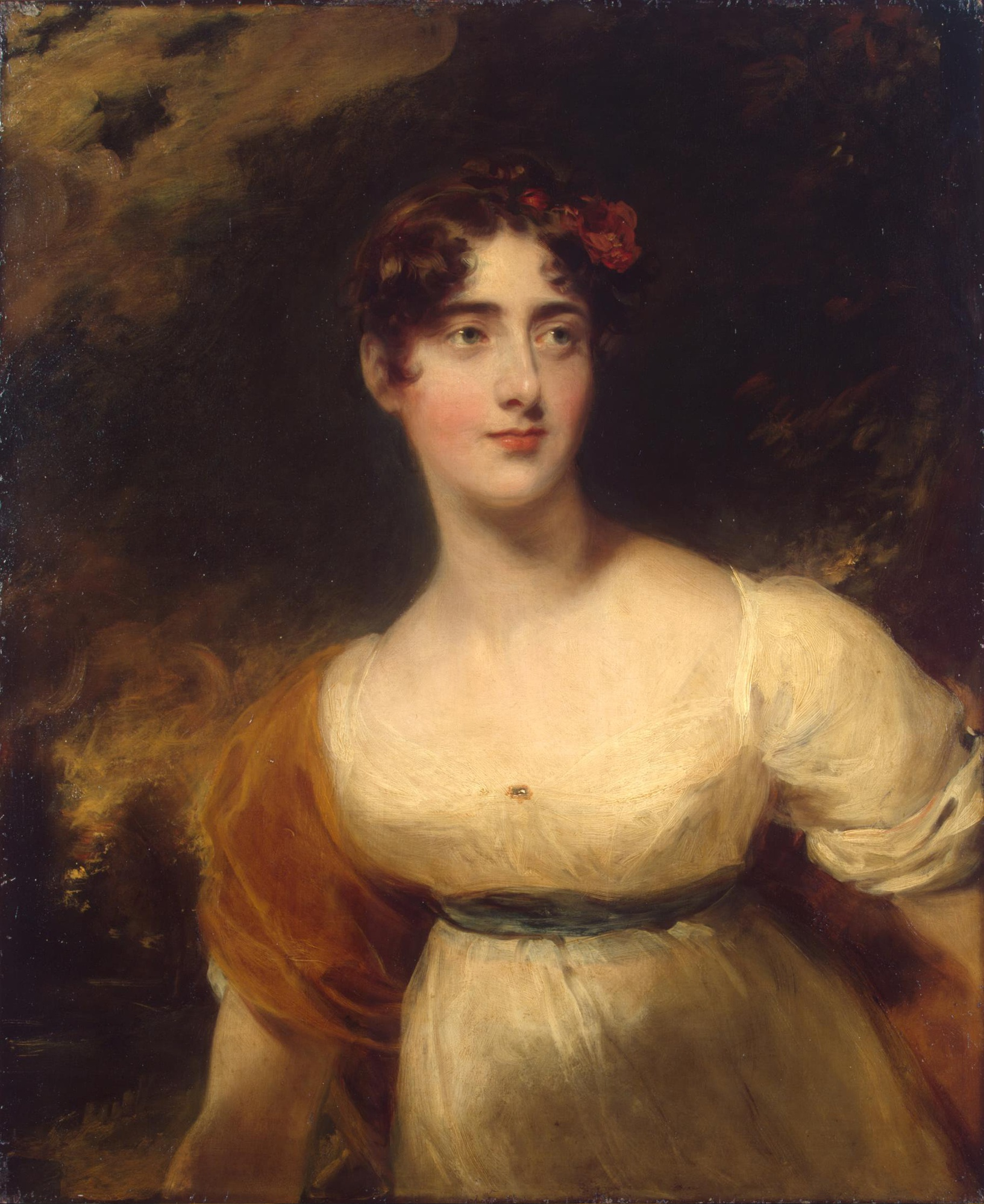
Portrait of Raglan's mother Emily, Lady Raglan by Thomas Lawrence, c.1814

On 25 September 1856 Somerset married Lady Georgina Lygon, the third daughter of Henry Lygon, 4th Earl Beauchamp and Lady Susan Caroline Eliot (a daughter of the 2nd Earl of St Germans). Before her death in 1865, they had five sons, including:

- George Somerset, 3rd Baron Raglan (1857–1921), who married Lady Ethel Jemima Ponsonby, daughter of Rev. Walter Ponsonby, 7th Earl of Bessborough and Lady Louisa Eliot (daughter of the 3rd Earl of St Germans), in 1883.
- Hon. Arthur Charles Edward Somerset (1859–1948), who married Louisa Eliza Hodgson, daughter of John Grant Hodgson, in 1893.
- Hon. Granville William Richard Somerset (1862–1901), who married Malvina Charlotte Mac Gregor, daughter of Rear-Admiral Sir Malcolm Murray-MacGregor, 4th Baronet and Lady Helen McDonnell (a daughter of 4th Earl of Antrim), in 1892.
- Hon. Wellesley Henry Somerset (1864–1864), who died in infancy.
- Hon. Richard FitzRoy Somerset (1866–1899), a Capt. in the Grenadier Guards who died unmarried.

After the death of his first wife, he married Mary Blanche Farquhar (c. 1845–1916) on 11 October 1871. Mary was the eldest daughter of Sir Walter Farquhar, 3rd Baronet and Lady Mary Octavia Somerset (daughter of the 6th Duke of Beaufort and Lady Charlotte Leveson-Gower). Together, they had one daughter:

- Violet Elizabeth Katharine Somerset (1874–1935), who married Lt.-Col. Wilfrid Robert Abel Smith, grandson of Abel Smith, in 1900.

Lord Raglan died in Chesterfield Street, London, on 3 May 1884, and was buried in Llandenny churchyard, Monmouthshire, on 8 May 1884.

== Ancestry ==
Ancestors of Richard Somerset, 2nd Baron Raglan

Henry Somerset, 2nd Duke of Beaufort
Charles Somerset, 4th Duke of Beaufort
Rachel Noel
Henry Somerset, 5th Duke of Beaufort
John Symes Berkeley
Elizabeth Berkeley
Elizabeth Norborne
FitzRoy Somerset, 1st Baron Raglan
Hugh Boscawen, 1st Viscount Falmouth
Admiral Rt. Hon. Edward Boscawen
Charlotte Godfrey
Elizabeth Boscawen
William Evelyn Glanville, High Sheriff of Kent
Frances Evelyn Glanville
Frances Glanville
Richard Somerset, 2nd Baron Raglan
Richard Wesley, 1st Baron Mornington
Garret Wesley, 1st Earl of Mornington
Elizabeth Sale
William Wellesley-Pole, 3rd Earl of Mornington
Arthur Hill-Trevor, 1st Viscount Dungannon
Hon. Annie Hill
Anne Stafford
Lady Emily Harriet Wellesley-Pole
George Forbes, 3rd Earl of Granard
Admiral John Forbes
Mary Stewart
Katherine Elizabeth Forbes
William Capell, 3rd Earl of Essex
Lady Mary Capell
Lady Jane Hyde

Peerage of the United Kingdom
Preceded by FitzRoy Somerset	Baron Raglan; 1855–1884	Succeeded by George Somerset
