= Cefntilla Court =

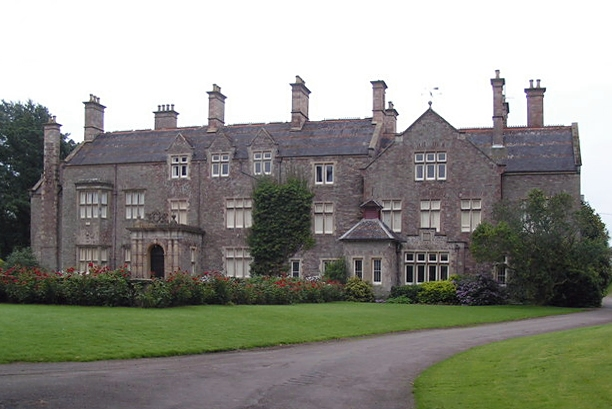
- "an important Victorian country house"

- Location within Monmouthshire
- 51.7218°N 2.8618°W
- Type: House
- Location: Llandenny, Monmouthshire

History
- Built: 1858, with earlier origins

Site notes
- Architect: Matthew Digby Wyatt
- Architectural style: Tudorbethan
- Governing body: Privately owned

Listed Building – Grade II*
- Official name: Cefn Tilla Court
- Designated: 31 January 2001
- Reference no.: 24741

Listed Building – Grade II
- Official name: Forecourt walls at Cefn Tilla Court
- Designated: 31 January 2001
- Reference no.: 24750

Listed Building – Grade II
- Official name: Coachyard at Cefn Tilla Court
- Designated: 31 January 2001
- Reference no.: 24751

Cadw/ICOMOS Register of Parks and Gardens of Special Historic Interest in Wales
- Official name: Cefntilla Court
- Designated: 1 February 2022
- Reference no.: PGW(Gt)31(Mon)
- Listing: Grade II

Cefntilla Court, (also Cefn Tilla), Llandenny, Monmouthshire, Wales, is a country house dating from the mid-19th century. Its origins date from 1616. During the English Civil War, the court was the headquarters of Thomas Fairfax during the siege of Raglan Castle and the terms of the castle's surrender were signed at the house in 1646. By the early 19th century, the court was derelict. In 1856 it was sold by Crawshay Bailey to the Memorial Committee established to commemorate the life of FitzRoy Somerset, 1st Baron Raglan, British commander during the Crimean War. The house was completely rebuilt by Thomas Henry Wyatt and donated to Lord Raglan's heir, Richard Somerset as a memorial to his father. The house is a Grade II* listed building.

== History ==
The original house at Cefntilla dates from 1616 and is recorded as the manor house of the Oates family. During the English Civil War, the Parliamentarian general Thomas Fairfax established his headquarters at Cefntilla while laying siege to Raglan Castle, some three miles to the north. In August 1646, the terms of surrender by the Marquess of Worcester were signed "in the dining room of Mr Roger Oates' house of Kevntilla". By the 18th century, the court had become a farmhouse, and when, in the 19th century, it was bought by Crawshay Bailey, the ironmaster, as part of his Monmouthshire estate at Llanfoist, the house was derelict. In 1856 Bailey sold the house to the Memorial Committee which had been established to commemorate the life of Lord Raglan.

FitzRoy Somerset (1788–1855), was born at Badminton House, the youngest son of Henry Somerset, 5th Duke of Beaufort. The Beauforts were the hereditary owners of Raglan Castle, but had abandoned it in favour of Badminton in Gloucestershire, after the castle's slighting in the Civil War. Enlisting in the British Army in 1804, Somerset fought in the Napoleonic Wars, attaining the rank of lieutenant colonel and serving on the staff of the Duke of Wellington at the Battle of Waterloo. He subsequently followed a political career and was raised to the peerage as Baron Raglan of Raglan in the County of Monmouthshire in 1852. In 1855 he was appointed a full general and commander-in-chief of the British forces during the Crimean War. He died in 1855 and was succeeded by his second son, Richard. In 1858, a group of the late Lord Raglan's "friends and admirers and comrades" purchased the house and estate as a memorial to him and presented it to Richard and his heirs in perpetuity. (Note: A carved inscription above the entrance porch reads: "This house with 238 acres of land was purchased by 1623 of the friends, admirers and comrades in arms of the late Field Marshal Lord Raglan GCB and presented by them to his son and his heirs forever as a lasting memorial of affectionate regard and respect.") Richard engaged Thomas Henry Wyatt to undertake complete rebuilding of the court in a Tudor style.

The Cefntilla estate passed by descent through the senior members of the Raglan family until the death of FitzRoy Somerset, 5th Baron Raglan in 2010. While the barony passed to his younger brother Geoffrey, the fifth lord bequeathed Cefntilla, its estate, and its major contents to the son of his sister, Henry van Moyland of Los Angeles. This led to a legal dispute between family members, at the conclusion of which the Raglan collection of military memorabilia, and many of the contents of the house, were sold at auction. In 2015, the house itself was sold. The court is a private residence, but is available for hire as a wedding venue.

Memorials to members of the Raglan branch of the Somerset family can be seen in Church of St John, Llandenny.

== Architecture and description ==
The house is built of Old Red Sandstone. John Newman, in his Gwent/Monmouthshire volume of the Pevsner Buildings of Wales describes Wyatt's design as "asymmetrical from every direction but not memorably grouped". Wyatt enveloped the original 17th-century building in his 19th-century reconstruction, but traces of the older house are still visible. The interior retains the original Jacobean architecture in the hall; it has an "unusual early Renaissance" hall frieze which came from Usk Priory. The frieze was decorated in the 1930s by FitzRoy Somerset, 4th Baron Raglan, the antiquarian and historian of Monmouthshire, and the author, with Cyril Fox, of the major study of vernacular architecture in the county, Monmouthshire Houses.

Cefntilla Court is a Grade II* listed building. The forecourt walls on the entrance frontage, and the coachyard, have their own Grade II listings. The park surrounding the house is listed Grade II on the Cadw/ICOMOS Register of Parks and Gardens of Special Historic Interest in Wales.

== Sources ==
- Bradney, Joseph (1992). A History of Monmouthshire: The Hundred of Raglan, Volume 2 Part 1. Academy Books. ISBN 1-873361-15-7.
- Newman, John (2000). Gwent/Monmouthshire. The Buildings of Wales. Penguin. ISBN 0-14-071053-1.
