= FitzRoy Somerset, 1st Baron Raglan =

British Army officer and politician (1788–1855)

Field Marshal The Right Honourable The Lord Raglan GCB PC
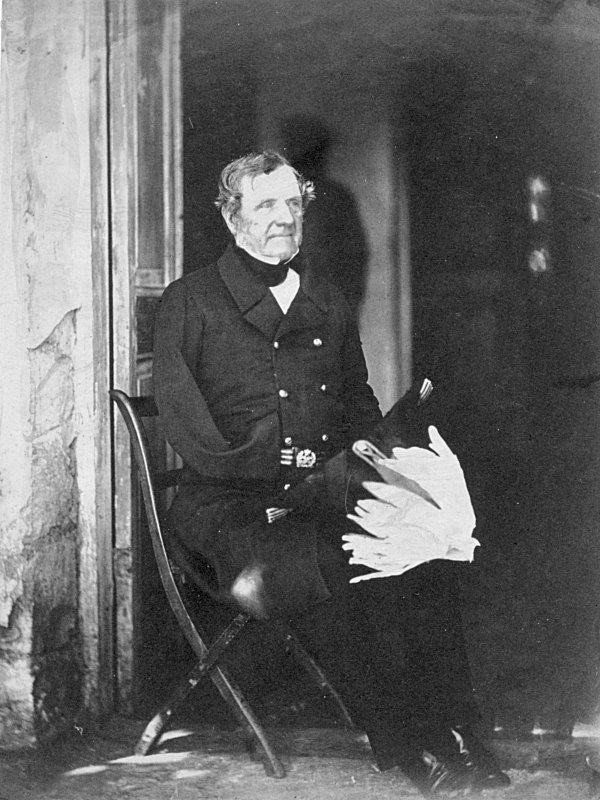
- Born: FitzRoy James Henry Somerset; 30 September 1788; Badminton, Gloucestershire, England
- Died: 28 June 1855 (aged 66); Sevastopol, Crimea, Russian Empire
- Burial place: St Michael and All Angels Church, Badminton
- Spouse: Lady Emily Wellesley-Pole (m. 1814)
- Military career
- Allegiance: United Kingdom
- Branch: British Army
- Service years: 1804–1855
- Rank: Field marshal
- Commands: Master-General of the Ordnance; British troops in the Crimea
- Wars: Napoleonic Wars; Peninsular War; Hundred Days; Crimean War
- Awards: Knight Grand Cross of the Order of the Bath; Knight's Cross of the Military Order of Max Joseph; Bavaria Army Gold Medal; Waterloo Medal; Order of the Medjidie, First Class (Ottoman Empire)

Field Marshal FitzRoy James Henry Somerset, 1st Baron Raglan (30 September 1788 – 28 June 1855), known before 1852 as Lord FitzRoy Somerset, was a British Army officer. When a junior officer, he served in the Peninsular War and the Waterloo campaign, latterly as military secretary to the Duke of Wellington. He also took part in politics as Tory Member of Parliament for Truro, before becoming Master-General of the Ordnance.

He became commander of the British troops sent to Crimea in 1854: his primary objective was to defend Constantinople, and he was also ordered to besiege the Russian port of Sevastopol. After an early success at the Battle of the Alma, a failure to deliver orders with sufficient clarity caused the fateful Charge of the Light Brigade at the Battle of Balaclava. Despite further success at the Battle of Inkerman, a poorly coordinated allied assault on Sevastopol in June 1855 was a complete failure. Raglan died later that month, after having dysentery and depression.

== Early life ==
Born at Badminton House in Gloucestershire as the ninth and youngest son of Henry Somerset, 5th Duke of Beaufort and his wife Elizabeth (daughter of Admiral Edward Boscawen), Somerset was educated at Westminster School and was commissioned as a cornet in the 4th Light Dragoons on 16 June 1804.

== Military career ==
Promoted to lieutenant on 1 June 1805, Somerset accompanied Sir Arthur Paget on his visit to Sultan Selim III of the Ottoman Empire, who had been aligning himself too closely with France, in 1807. He became a captain in the 43rd Regiment of Foot on 5 May 1808 shortly before his appointment as aide-de-camp to Sir Arthur Wellesley in July 1808. Somerset accompanied Wellesley's Army when it was sent to Portugal later that month. Somerset fought at the Second Battle of Porto in May 1809, the Battle of Talavera in July 1809 and the Battle of Bussaco (where he was wounded) in September 1810. He was appointed acting military secretary to Wellington in November 1810 and fought with him at the Battle of Pombal in March 1811, the Battle of Sabugal in April 1811 and the Battle of Fuentes de Oñoro in May 1811. Promoted to brevet major on 9 June 1811, he also took part in the Battle of El Bodón in September 1811. He specially distinguished himself at the storming of Badajoz in March 1812 by being the first to mount the breach and by helping to secure the surrender of the French Governor and was duly promoted to lieutenant colonel on 27 April 1812.

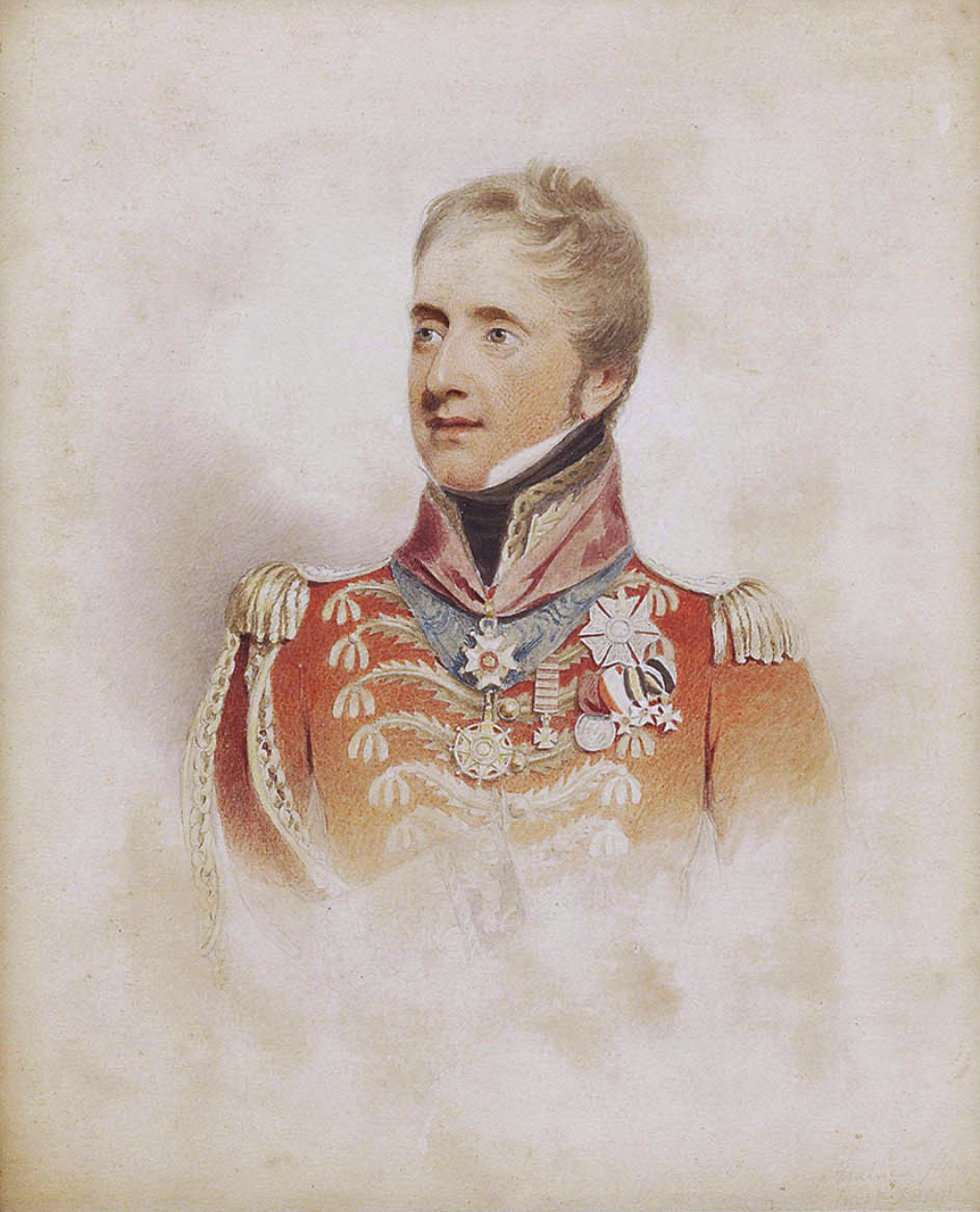
FitzRoy James Henry Somerset, by William Haines

Somerset went on to fight with Wellington at the Battle of Salamanca in July 1812, the Siege of Burgos in September 1812 and the Battle of Vitoria in June 1813 as well as the Siege of San Sebastián in July 1813, the Battle of the Pyrenees in July 1813 and the Battle of Nivelle in November 1813. They also fought together at the Battle of the Nive in December 1813, the Battle of Orthez in February 1814 and the Battle of Toulouse in April 1814. Following Wellington's appointment as British Ambassador during the short period of Bourbon restoration, Somerset assumed a role as his secretary at the Embassy on 5 July 1814. Somerset transferred to the 1st Guards on 25 July 1814 and was appointed a Knight Commander of the Order of the Bath on 2 January 1815.

Somerset also saw action during the Hundred Days: he served on Wellington's staff at the Battle of Quatre Bras on 16 June 1815 and at the Battle of Waterloo two days later where he had to have his right arm amputated (and then demanded his arm back so he could retrieve the ring that his wife had given him). Faced with the difficulties in dressing following the amputation, he invented the so-called Raglan sleeve, sewn from the collar rather than the shoulder.

Promoted to colonel and appointed an aide-de-camp to the Prince Regent on 28 August 1815, he was appointed a Knight of the Bavarian Military Order of Max Joseph on 3 October 1815. He remained with the Army of Occupation in France until May 1816 when he returned to the post of secretary at the British Embassy in Paris.

Somerset was elected Tory Member of Parliament for Truro in 1818 and became Wellington's secretary in the latter's new capacity as Master-General of the Ordnance in 1819. Somerset lost his seat at the general election in 1820 but, having been promoted to major-general on 27 May 1825, regained his seat in Parliament in 1826. Following Wellington's appointment as Commander-in-Chief of the Forces in January 1827 Somerset became Military Secretary in August 1827. He stood down from Parliament in 1829 and was promoted to lieutenant-general on 28 June 1838. Advanced to Knight Grand Cross of the Order of the Bath on 24 September 1852, he became Master-General of the Ordnance on 30 September 1852 and was raised to the peerage as Baron Raglan of Raglan in the County of Monmouthshire on 11 October 1852.

== Crimean War ==
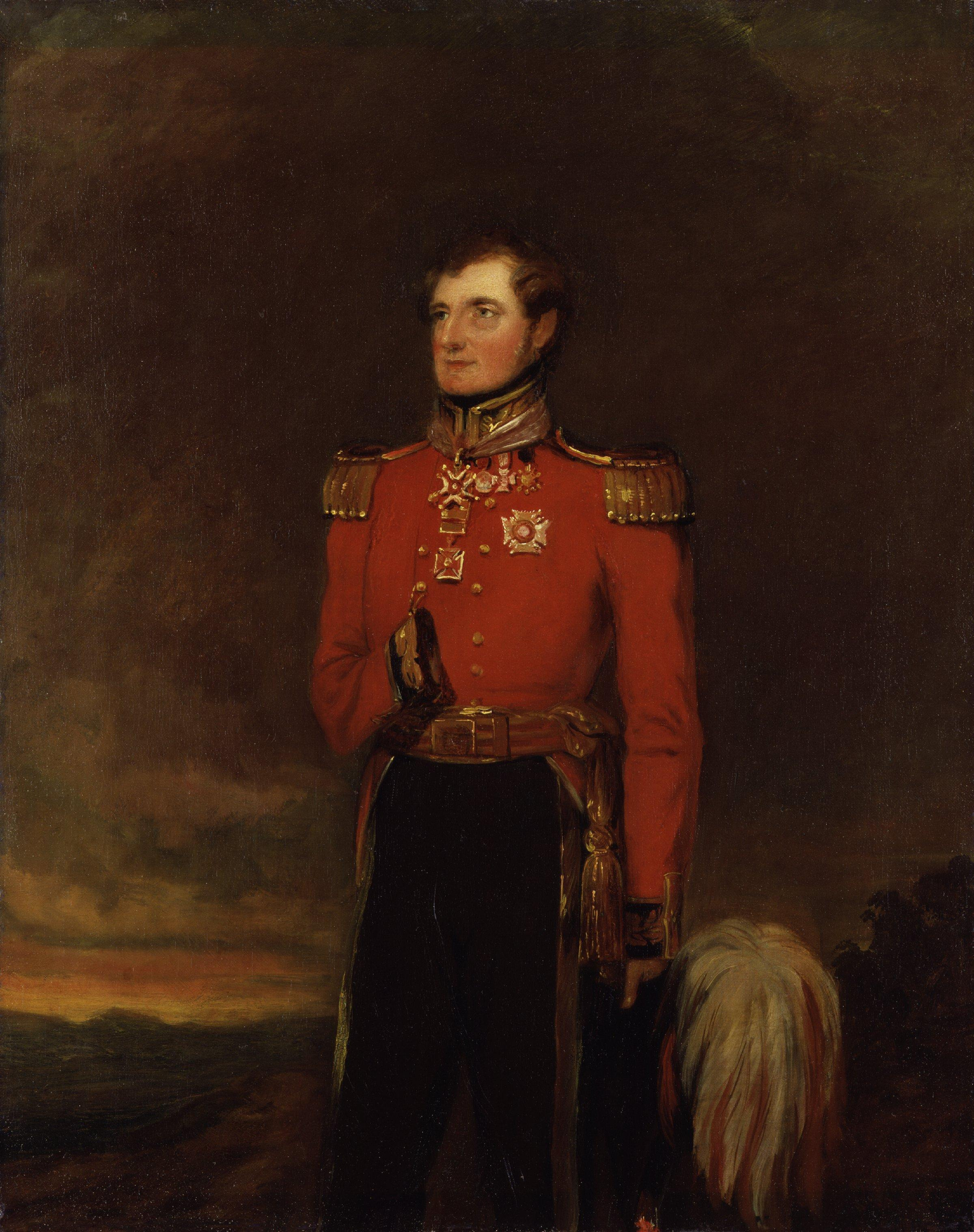
FitzRoy Somerset by William Salter, 1838–1840

Raglan became commander of the British troops sent to the Crimea with the temporary rank of full general on 21 February 1854 and was promoted to the substantive rank of full general on 20 June 1854. While Raglan's primary objective was to defend Constantinople he was ordered by the Duke of Newcastle, who was at the time Secretary of State for War, to besiege the Russian port of Sevastopol "unless it could not be undertaken with a reasonable prospect of success". An Anglo-French force under the joint command of Somerset and General Jacques St. Arnaud defeated General Alexander Menshikov's Russian army at the Battle of the Alma in September 1854.

During the campaign Raglan had the abstracted habit of referring to the Russian enemies as "the French". While this eccentricity is often cited as evidence of his unsuitability for high command, he did in fact speak fluent French and relations between the two allies in the field were good.

At the Battle of Balaclava in October 1854, Raglan issued an order to the Earl of Lucan, his cavalry commander, who in turn ordered the Earl of Cardigan, a subordinate commander who happened to be Lucan's brother-in-law and who detested him, to lead the fateful Charge of the Light Brigade leading to some 278 British casualties. Despite an indecisive result at Balaclava the British and French allied army gained a victory at the Battle of Inkerman in November 1854 and Raglan was promoted to the rank of field marshal on 5 November 1854. He was also awarded the Ottoman Empire Order of the Medjidie, 1st Class on 15 May 1855.

Oriental Army of the Crimean campaign by Gustav Bartsch. From left to right: Admiral Ferdinand-Alphonse Hamelin, Lord Lucan, Lord Raglan, Admiral Dundas, Sir John Campbell, Duke of Cambridge, Lord Cardigan, Ismail Pasha, Omer Pasha, Muhlis Pasha (Grigore Sturdza), Sultan Abdülmecid I, Said-Bey (Vasile Obedeanu), Ahmed Pasha, col. Desmaret, Marshal Baraguey d'Hilliers, Prince Napoleon, col. Trochu, Marshal de Saint-Arnaud, general Bosquet, general de Canrobert

Raglan was blamed by the press and the government for the sufferings of the British soldiers in the terrible Crimean winter during the Siege of Sevastopol owing to shortages of food and clothing although this, in part, was the fault of the home authorities who failed to provide adequate logistical support. A piecemeal allied assault on Sevastopol on 18 June 1855 was a complete failure. The anxieties of the siege began to seriously undermine Raglan's health and he died unexpectedly on 28 June 1855, while suffering with dysentery and depression. His body was embalmed, his heart buried in the garden of his headquarters in Sevastopol, and his body brought home and interred at St Michael and All Angels Church, Badminton.

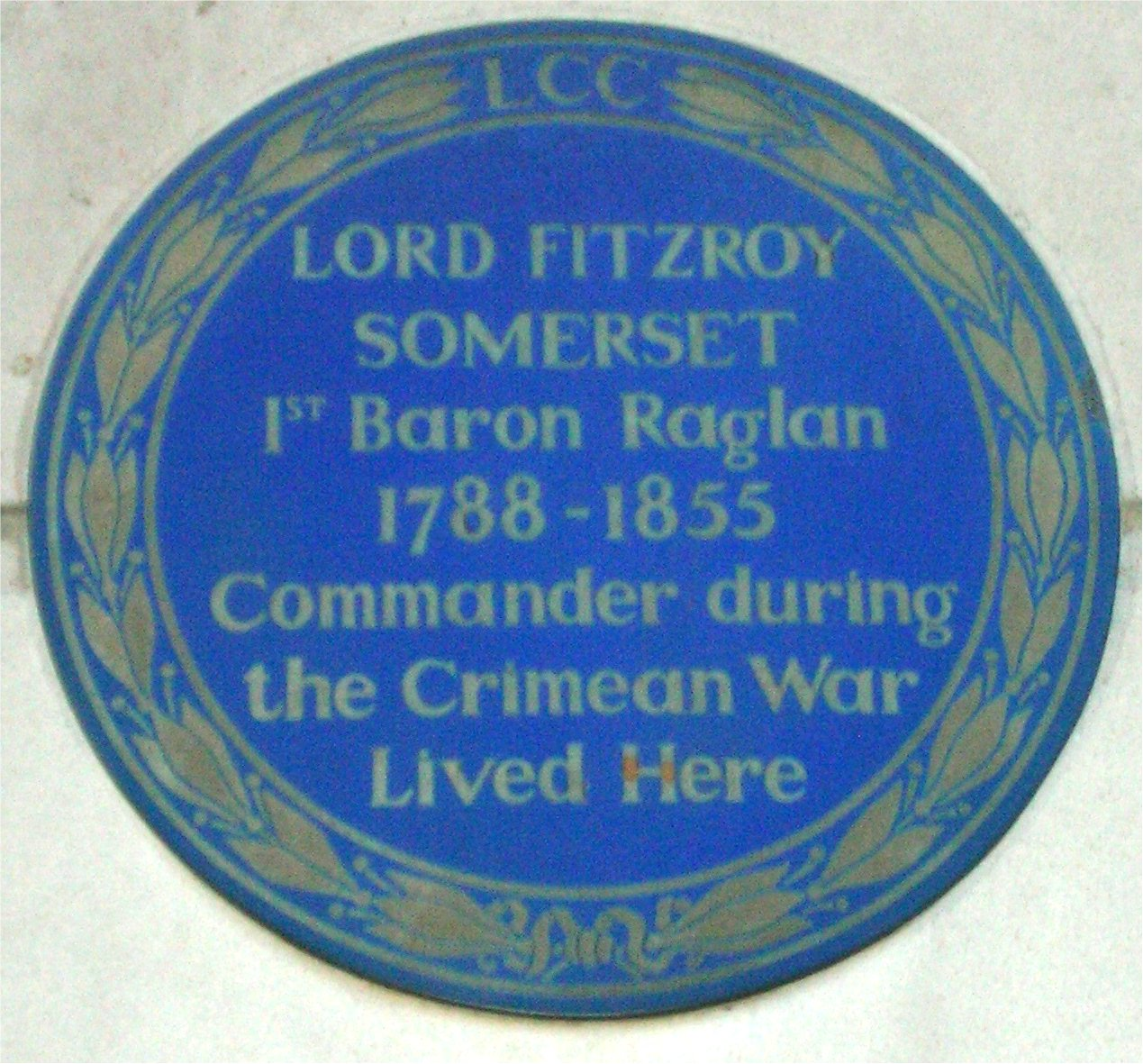
Blue plaque at Stanhope Gate, London

Raglan had also served as honorary colonel of the 53rd Regiment of Foot and then as honorary colonel of the Royal Regiment of Horse Guards (The Blues). Cefntilla Court, Llandenny was built as a lasting memorial to Somerset in 1858: an inscription over the porch there reads:

This house with 238 acres of land was purchased by 1623 of the friends, admirers and comrades in arms of the late Field Marshal Lord Raglan GCB and presented by them to his son and his heirs for ever in a lasting memorial of affectionate regard and respect.

A blue plaque was erected outside Raglan's house at Stanhope Gate in London in 1911.

== Family ==
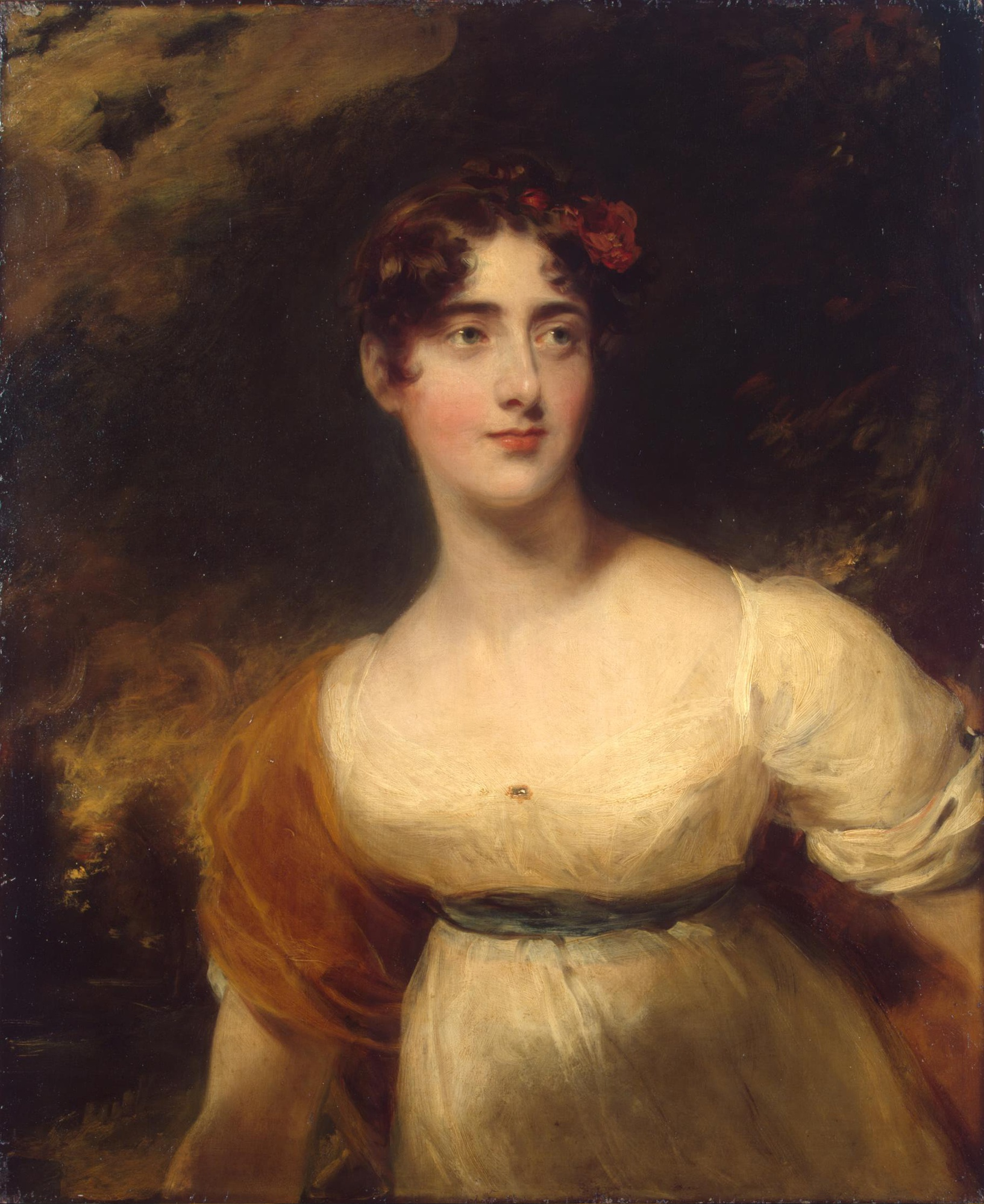
Emily Harriet Wellesley-Pole, Lady FitzRoy Somerset by Thomas Lawrence.

On 6 August 1814 Somerset married Lady Emily Harriet Wellesley-Pole (daughter of William Wellesley-Pole, 3rd Earl of Mornington, and niece of the Duke of Wellington). They had three sons, and two daughters:

- Charlotte Caroline Elizabeth Somerset (16 May 1815 - 1906)
- Arthur William FitzRoy Somerset (6 May 1816 – 21 December 1845)
- Richard Henry Fitzroy Somerset, 2nd Baron Raglan (24 May 1817 – 3 May 1884)
- Frederick John Fitzroy Somerset (8 Mar 1821 - 26 Nov 1824)
- Katherine Anne Emily Cecilia Somerset (31 Aug 1824 - 1915)

== Ancestry ==
Ancestors of FitzRoy Somerset, 1st Baron Raglan

Henry Somerset, 2nd Duke of Beaufort
Charles Somerset, 4th Duke of Beaufort
Rachel Noel
Henry Somerset, 5th Duke of Beaufort
John Symes Berkeley
Elizabeth Berkeley
Elizabeth Norborne
FitzRoy Somerset, 1st Baron Raglan
Hugh Boscawen, 1st Viscount Falmouth
Admiral Edward Boscawen
Charlotte Godfrey
Elizabeth Boscawen
William Evelyn Glanville, High Sheriff of Kent
Frances Evelyn Glanville
Frances Glanville

== Cultural depictions ==
Raglan was portrayed by John Gielgud in the film The Charge of the Light Brigade (1968). Lord Raglan is a character in George MacDonald Fraser's novel Flashman at the Charge, in which he is described as a kindly, but ineffectual man, and completely unsuited for his command.

== See also ==
- Raglan sleeve

== Sources ==
- Calthorpe, Somerset John Gough (1857). Letters from Headquarters: Or, The Realities of the War in the Crimea, by an Officer on the Staff. London: John Murray.
- Heathcote, Tony (1999). The British Field Marshals, 1736–1997: A Biographical Dictionary. Barnsley: Leo Cooper. ISBN 0-85052-696-5.
- Hibbert, Christopher (1999). The Destruction of Lord Raglan. Wordsworth Editions. ISBN 978-1840222098.
- Martin, Theodore (1877). The Life of His Royal Highness the Prince Consort, Volume III. Smith Elder & Co, London.

Parliament of the United Kingdom
Preceded by Sir George Warrender, Bt; George Dashwood	Member of Parliament for Truro; 1818–1820; With: William Edward Tomline	Succeeded by Sir Hussey Vivian; William Gossett
Preceded by Sir Hussey Vivian; William Gossett	Member of Parliament for Truro; 1826–1829; With: William Edward Tomline	Succeeded by Viscount Encombe; Nathaniel Peach
Military offices
Preceded by Sir Herbert Taylor	Military Secretary; 1827–1852	Succeeded by Richard Airey
Preceded by The Marquess of Anglesey	Colonel of the Royal Regiment of Horse Guards (The Blues); 1854–1855	Succeeded by The Viscount Gough
Political offices
Preceded by The Viscount Hardinge	Master-General of the Ordnance; 1852–1855	Office abolished
Peerage of the United Kingdom
New creation	Baron Raglan; 1852–1855	Succeeded by Richard Somerset
