= St John's Church, Llandenny =

Church of St John, Llandenny
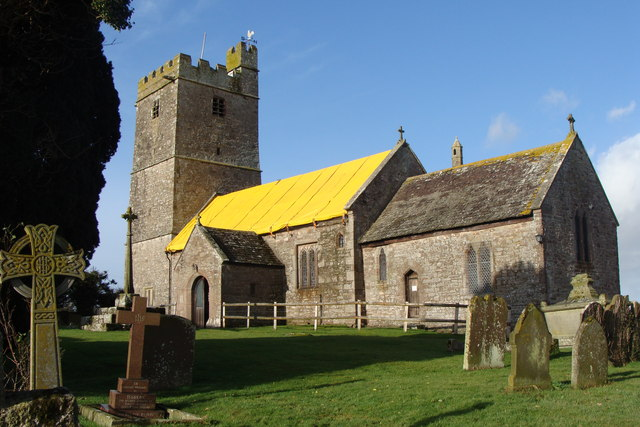
- Church of St John
- Church of St John, Llandenny
- 51.73095°N 2.84830°W
- Location: Monmouthshire
- Country: Wales
- Denomination: Church in Wales

History
- Status: Grade I listed

Architecture
- Style: Perdendicular
- Years built: 14th/15th century

Administration
- Diocese: Monmouth

The Church of St John is the parish church of Llandenny, Monmouthshire, Wales. It is in the Perpendicular style and is a Grade I listed building as of 27 November 1953.

== History and architecture ==
The church dates from the twelfth century, the date of the nave, although the chancel is fourteenth century and the roofs and tower fifteenth century. It has a well-preserved Norman window. The building is of Old Red Sandstone. The church was restored in 1860-65 by John Prichard and John Pollard Seddon and again by G.E.Halliday in 1900–01. The Arts and Crafts chancel rails are from this date.

Memorials to a number of members of the Raglan branch of the Somerset family, whose seat is nearby Cefntilla Court, can be seen in the church.

Services are held at the church each Sunday.
