= Emily Somerset, Lady Raglan =

Wife of British aristocrat

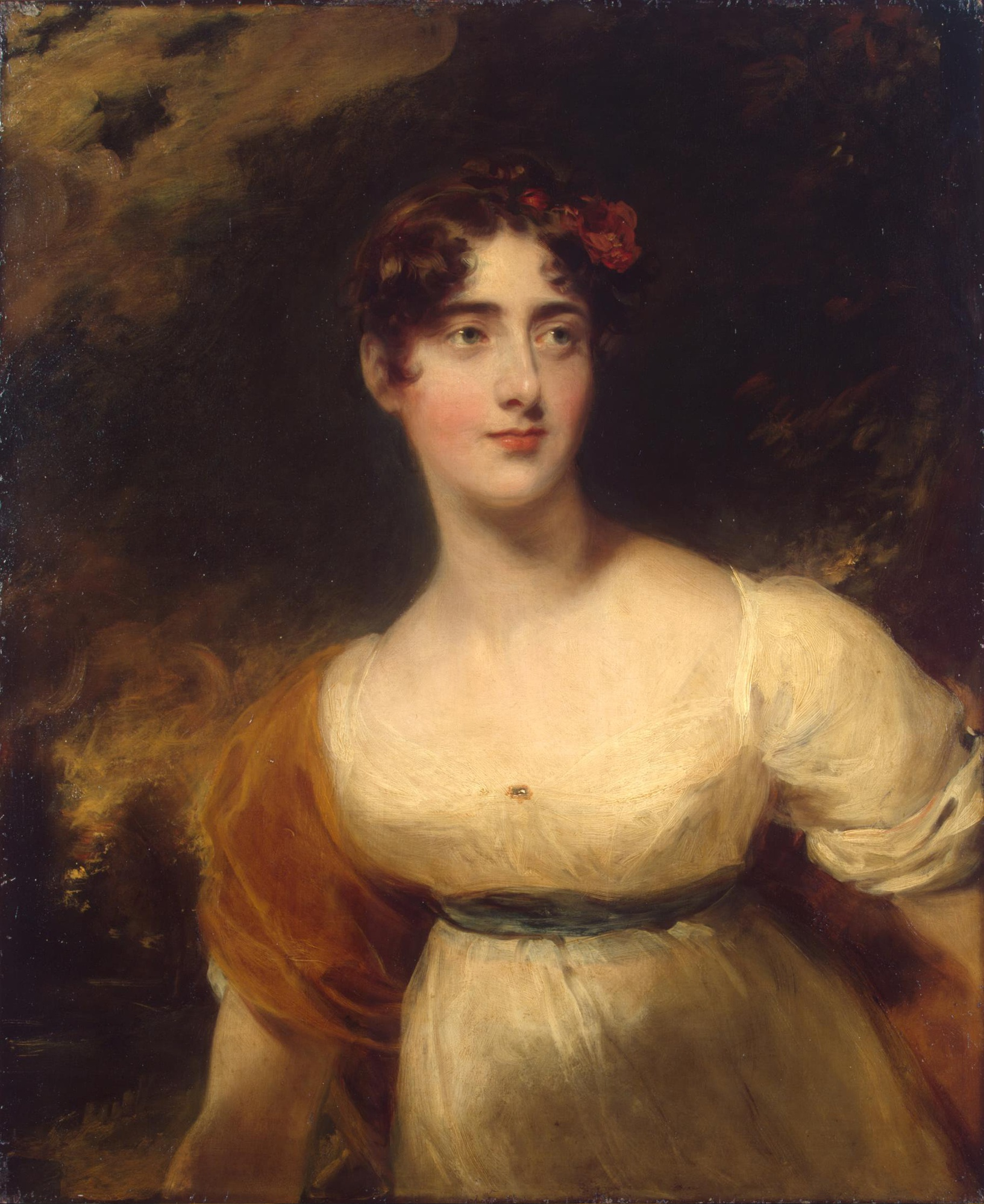
Portrait of Emily Harriet Wellesley-Pole by Sir Thomas Lawrence, c.1814.

Emily Harriet Somerset, Lady Raglan (1792–1881) was a British aristocrat and political hostess. She was the wife of the English general Lord Raglan, best known for his command of British forces during the Crimean War.

The daughter of William Wellesley-Pole and Katherine Forbes, she was of Anglo-Irish background on both sides. Her father was from a prominent Irish family who achieved great success during the reign of George III. Late in life her father inherited his elder brother Richard's Irish title Earl of Mornington. Her uncle the Duke of Wellington was a military commander during the Peninsular War and the Waterloo campaign and later served as Prime Minister.

In 1814 she married Fitzroy Somerset, then a colonel in the British Army. During the following year he lost an arm during the Battle of Waterloo. He subsequently launched a political career as Tory Member of Parliament and after serving for decades under her uncle Wellington, he was given command of the British expeditionary force to Crimea. He died on 28 June 1855 during the Siege of Sevastopol. She outlived her husband by twenty six years, dying on 6 March 1881.

== Family ==
The couple had five children:

- Charlotte Caroline Elizabeth Somerset (16 May 1815 - 1906)
- Arthur William FitzRoy Somerset (6 May 1816 – 21 December 1845)
- Richard Henry Fitzroy Somerset, 2nd Baron Raglan (24 May 1817 – 3 May 1884)
- Frederick John Fitzroy Somerset (8 Mar 1821 - 26 Nov 1824)
- Katherine Anne Emily Cecilia Somerset (31 Aug 1824 - 1915)

== Cultural depictions ==
In 1814 she was painted by Thomas Lawrence, the leading portraitist of the Regency era, as a wedding present from her husband. The work is now in the Hermitage Museum in Saint Petersburg.

== Bibliography ==
- Gubchevskiĭ, Pavel Filippovich. The Hermitage Museum: A Short Guide. Foreign Languages Publishing House, 1955.
- Sweetman, John. Raglan: From the Peninsular to the Crimea. Pen and Sword, 2010.
- Watson, Bruce Allen. Sieges: From the Siege of Jerusalem to the Gulf War. Stackpole Books, 2009.
