= Llandenny =

Coordinates: 51.7306°N 2.8482°W

Llandenny: Welsh: Llandenni
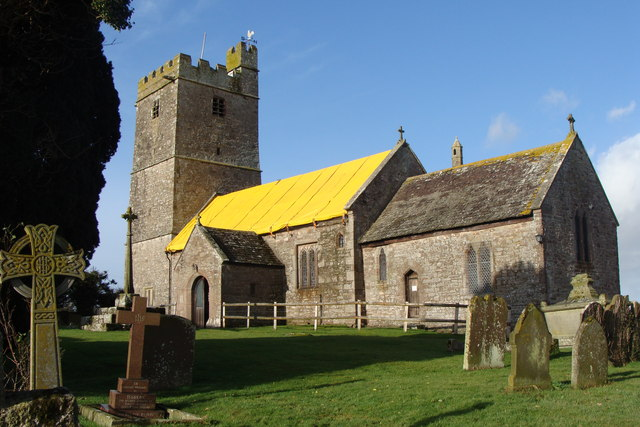
- The Church of St John the Apostle and Evangelist, Llandenny (during the restoration of its roof)

- Location within Monmouthshire
- OS grid reference: SO415038
- Community: Raglan
- Principal area: Monmouthshire
- Preserved county: Gwent
- Country: Wales
- Sovereign state: United Kingdom
- Post town: USK
- Postcode district: NP15
- Dialling code: 01291
- Police: Gwent
- Fire: South Wales
- Ambulance: Welsh
- UK Parliament: Monmouth
- Senedd Cymru – Welsh Parliament: Monmouth

Llandenny (Welsh: Llandenni or, lesser used, Mathenni) is a village in Monmouthshire, south east Wales. Llandenny is located three miles south of Raglan and three miles north of Usk.

== History and amenities ==
The little village of Llandenny is just a few houses, a pub (the Raglan Arms - closed) and the Church of St John, named after St John the Apostle and Evangelist. The main south Wales to the Midlands road link, the A449, passes close to the village.

The Raglan Arms was named for Lord Raglan who owned the nearby Cefn Tilla Court until it was sold in 2015, following the death of Fitzroy Somerset in 2010. A landlord of the pub in the 1930s was Frank Wake who catered nearly always for the farm labourers and not the gentry so it became a 'thorn in the flesh' of the Raglan family.

The nearby Llandenny railway station building (photographed) existed for many years until it was converted into a residential property. It included a ground frame signal box on the platform, a cattle dock and small goods sidings. It stood on the Coleford, Monmouth, Usk and Pontypool Railway line and closed in 1959.

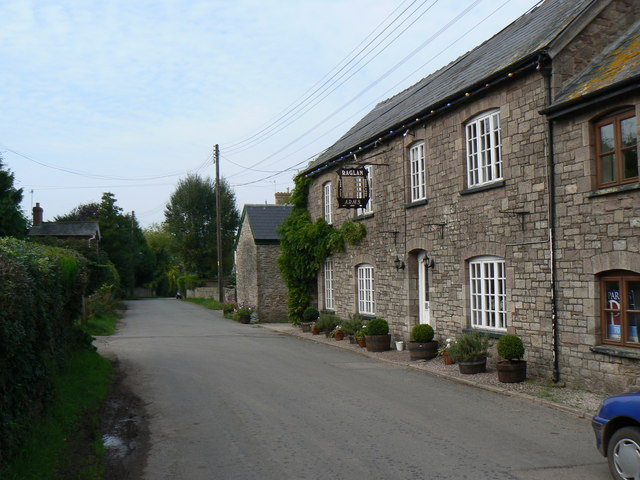
The Raglan Arms

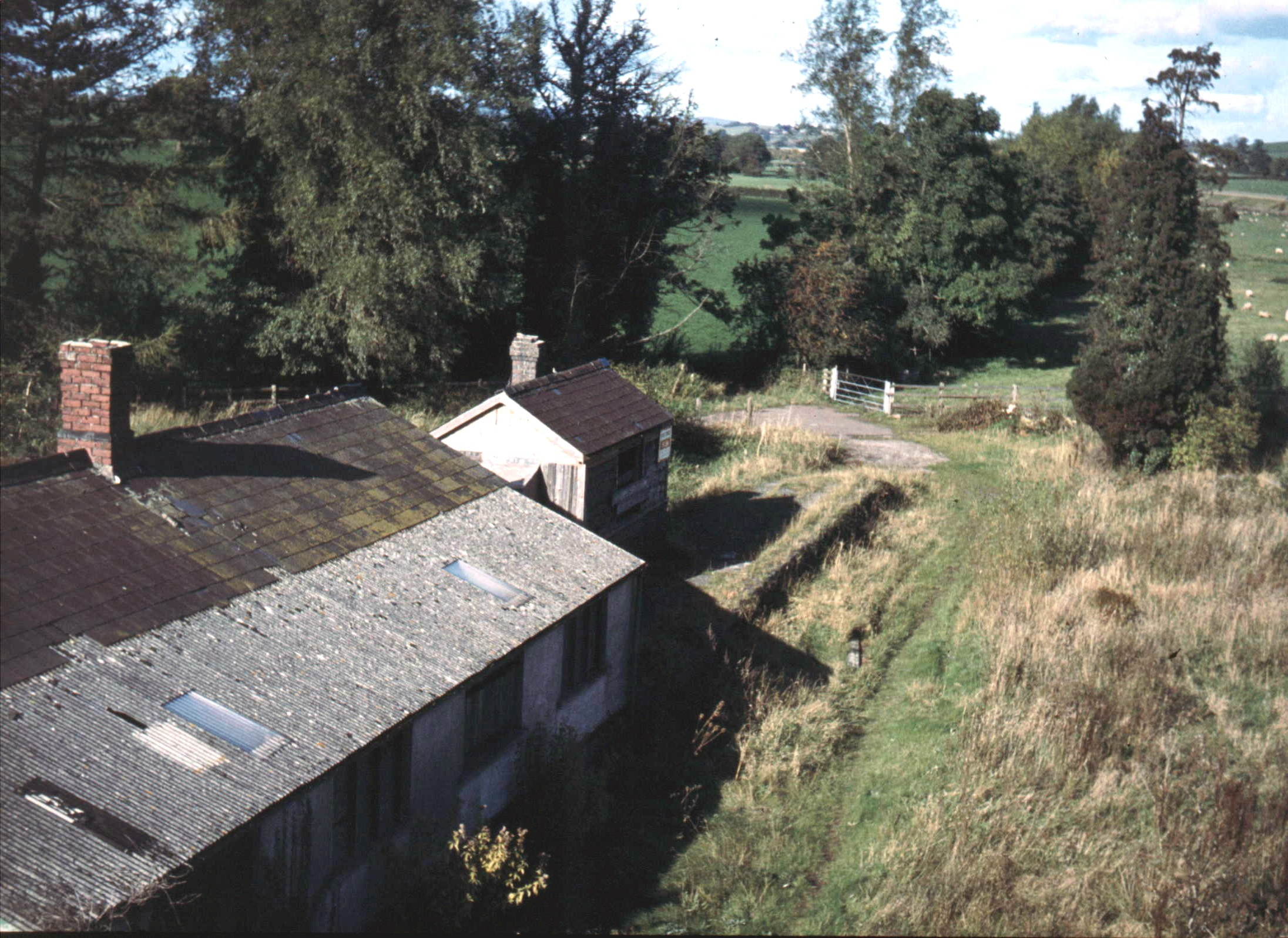
The disused railway station
