= FitzRoy Somerset, 5th Baron Raglan =

British Baron (1927–2010)

The Right Honourable The Lord Raglan
- Full name: FitzRoy John Somerset
- Born: 8 November 1927
- Died: 24 January 2010 (aged 82)
- Noble family: House of Beaufort
- Spouse: Alice Baily (m. 1973; div. 1981)
- Father: FitzRoy Somerset, 4th Baron Raglan
- Mother: Julia Hamilton

FitzRoy John Somerset, 5th Baron Raglan (8 November 1927 – 24 January 2010) was a British peer. He was born on 8 November 1927 to FitzRoy Richard Somerset, 4th Baron Raglan and the Hon. Julia Hamilton. In 1973, he married Alice Baily, whom he divorced in 1981; the marriage produced no children.

Raglan succeeded his father to the barony in 1964, and took the Labour Party whip in the House of Lords. However, in 1983 he defected to the Social Democratic Party (SDP), citing his unwillingness to support Labour's policy on unilateral nuclear disarmament and its opposition to Britain's membership of the European Economic Community (EEC). He declined to follow the majority of the SDP into the Liberal Democrats, instead becoming a member of the 'continuing' SDP, led by David Owen.

In addition to politics, Raglan was the Patron of the Bugatti Owners' Club, owners and operators of the renowned Prescott Speed Hill Climb, near Cheltenham, Gloucestershire. He was also chairman of Cwmbran New Town Development Corporation from 1970 to 1983, and was later president of the equality charity, Parity.

Raglan died in the early hours of 24 January 2010 at Nevill Hall Hospital in Abergavenny, Monmouthshire, aged 82. As he left no children, he was succeeded in the barony by his brother, Geoffrey, who became the sixth baron. However, Raglan willed the family seat, Cefntilla Court, to a nephew, Henry van Moyland of Los Angeles, not to the baron or his heirs.

Peerage of the United Kingdom
Preceded by FitzRoy Richard Somerset	Baron Raglan; 1964–2010	Succeeded by Geoffrey Somerset
