= Raglan, Monmouthshire =

Village in Monmouthshire, Wales

Raglan: Welsh: Rhaglan
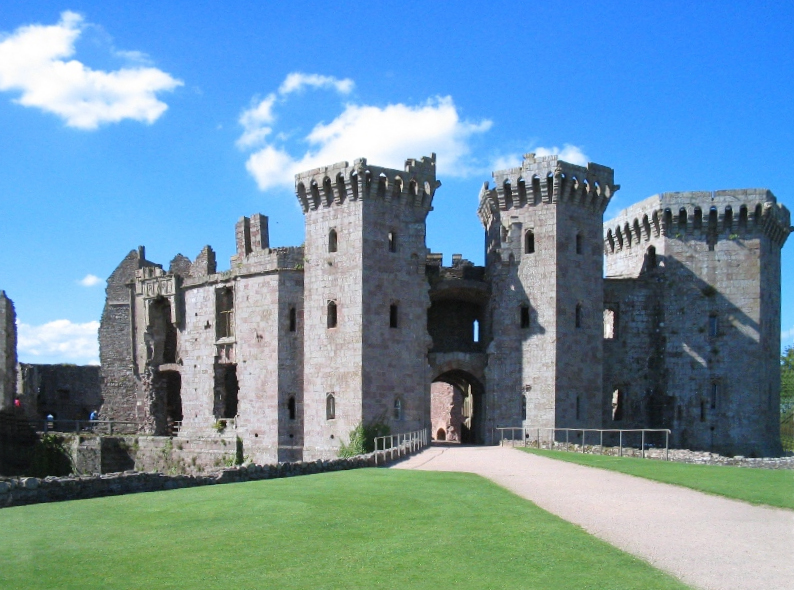
- Raglan Castle from the front, with main gatehouse at the centre

- Location within Monmouthshire
- Population: 1,928 (2011)
- OS grid reference: SO413077
- Principal area: Monmouthshire
- Preserved county: Gwent
- Country: Wales
- Sovereign state: United Kingdom
- Post town: USK
- Postcode district: NP15
- Dialling code: 01291
- Police: Gwent
- Fire: South Wales
- Ambulance: Welsh
- UK Parliament: Monmouth
- List of places UK Wales Monmouthshire 51.7649°N 2.85°W Map of the community

Raglan (/ˈræɡlən/; Welsh: Rhaglan) is a village and community in Monmouthshire, south-east Wales. It is located some 9 miles south-west of Monmouth, midway between Monmouth and Abergavenny on the A40 road very near to the junction with the A449 road. It is the location of Raglan Castle, built for William ap Thomas and now maintained by Cadw. The community includes the villages of Llandenny and Pen-y-clawdd. Raglan itself has a population of 1,183.

== History and buildings ==
The village stands at the crossing point of two Roman roads, that from Gloucester to Usk, and that from Chepstow to Abergavenny. Raglan was first mentioned in the will of Walter de Clare. The earliest market in Raglan was recorded in 1354. The market cross stands in the edge of the crossroads between the church and the Beaufort Arms Inn. It now consists only of the base, with a lamp post mounted on top. In the large space around this stone the markets were held, the base of the cross forming the table on which bargains were struck.

The agricultural roots of Raglan are illustrated by a 1397 account of discussions between the reeve Ieuan Hire and Ieuan ap Grono and haywards (hedge wardens) Iorwerth ap Gwillym and Hoe ap Gwillym Goch, held in the records depository at Badminton House. The earliest records of the manor of Raglan Court are found in 26 October – 28 July 1391 during the reign of Richard II. At this time Raglan Castle was probably no more than a hill fort. After 1415 Raglan Castle was greatly expanded and by 1587 contemporary descriptions refer to Raglan as a town. For the court, 13 July 1587, the marginal heading reads Burgus de Ragland cum Curia Manerii de Ragland cum membris and the caption becomes 'The Court of William Somerset, 3rd Earl of Worcester of his said borough and the Court of the said Earl of his said manor with members'. From 1 June 1587 onwards most courts refer to the Borough of Ragland in the following manner: 'The Court of the said manor with the Court of the borough or the town of Ragland'.

By 1632, a courthouse was established in Raglan; the Badminton record stating, "the jury to meet at the Court House at Ragland the 25th March next by ten of the clock under peyn of xls. apeece to have a view and inquire of lands in Landenny (Llandenny) and Ragland late of Philip David Morris", (Dec. 1632). Subsequent leet courts refer to the liberty of Raglan and in 1682 the hundred of Ragland is mentioned. Court Roll excerpts reflect the issues of the day: In 1680, ‘The bridge called Pontleecke upon the highway leading from Raglan towards Chepstow to be out of repair. Moses Morgan fined for not spending 14s of the parish money towards repairing the stocks and whipping post in the parish of Raglan’. In 1695 the repair of bridges are still under discussion, ‘The bridge called Pont y bonehouse in the town of Raglan, 1695. John Curre, gent., steward’.

The local railway station closed in 1955. The railway station buildings have been removed to St Fagans. The village continued to be an important thoroughfare in the 18th and 19th centuries, which explains its three substantial coaching inns the Beaufort Arms, the Ship and the Crown where the mail coaches would stop. The Crown is now closed.

Castle Street runs north from the village to the castle, although it is now bisected by the A449. The village end of the street contains six Listed buildings; Castell Coch, Exmoor House, and The Malthouse, which form a continuous terrace on the eastern side, and 7, and 8, Castle Street and The Old Post Office, which form a run on the western side. Other listed buildings in the village include the Baptist Chapel, the Post Office, and village store, Elm Cottages on the Chepstow Road, a milestone on the old Monmouth Road which records the distances "To Monmouth 7 Miles, Raglan Police Station 3/4", and the telephone box in the centre of the village which is to the K6 design and dates from the reign of George VI.

=== Raglan Castle ===
The English Civil War had disastrous consequences both for the castle and the village. The castle was under siege for two months from 3 June to 19 August 1646 by Parliamentarian forces, finally surrendering to Thomas Morgan. It was then slighted to prevent refortification. In the 18th century the ruins were neglected and were used as a quarry for those needing stone to repair their houses: dressed and moulded stones can be seen in farmhouses and cottages in the area. The castle is now maintained by Cadw, although the Duke of Beaufort remains its hereditary keeper.

=== St Cadoc's Church ===
St Cadoc's is a substantial mediaeval church, extensively restored in the 19th century by Thomas Henry Wyatt. It houses some much-defaced tombs of the Lords of Raglan. The base of a fine pilgrim's cross can be seen in the churchyard. The first part of the church was built during the 14th century. The church is a Grade II* listed building.

=== Cross at Croes Llwyd Farm ===
On Broom Lane, to the east of Broom House, stands a medieval stone cross, 1.9 metres (6.2 ft) high, with an octagonal shaft. The cross is a Grade I listed structure and a scheduled monument.

== Governance ==
Raglan elects a community council of eleven community councillors. Raglan is also a county electoral ward for elections to Monmouthshire County Council, represented by one county councillor.

== Gallery ==
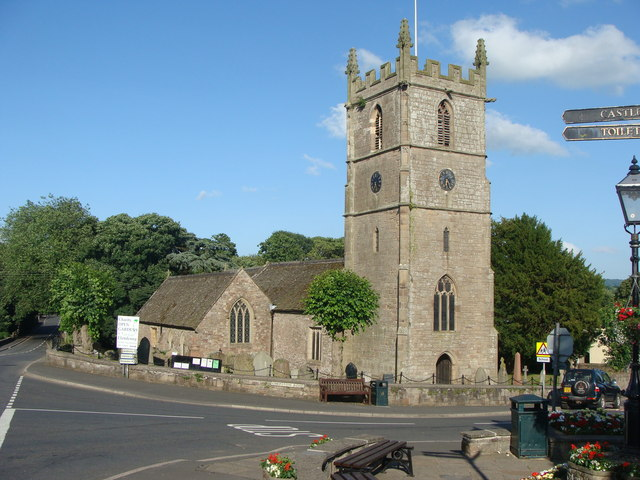
St Cadoc's Church, at a crossroads in the centre of the village

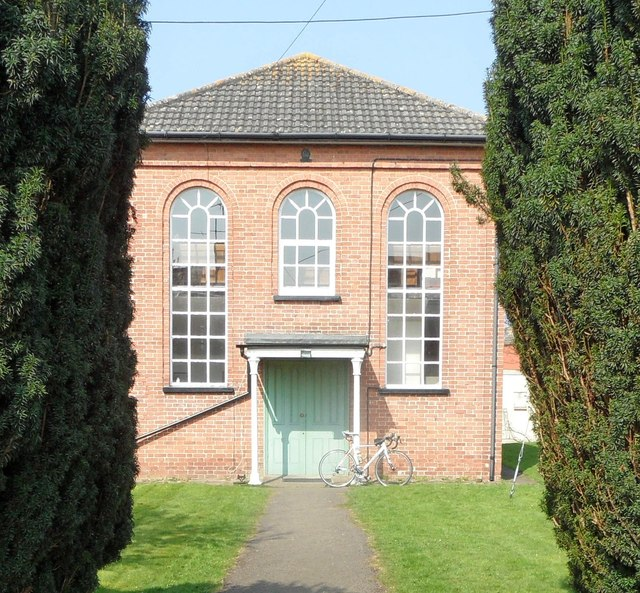
The Baptist Chapel

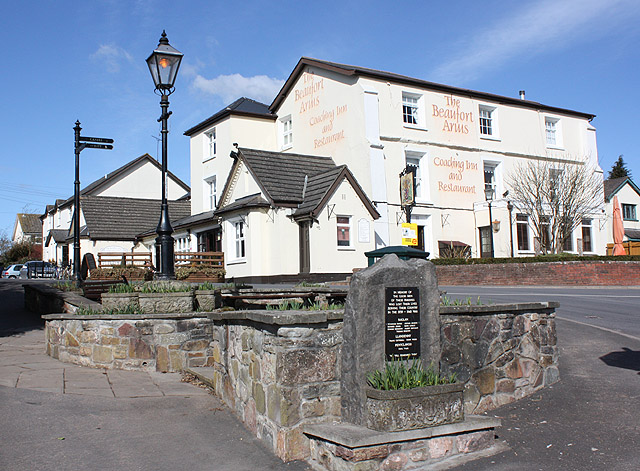
The Beaufort Arms, a 17th-century coaching inn

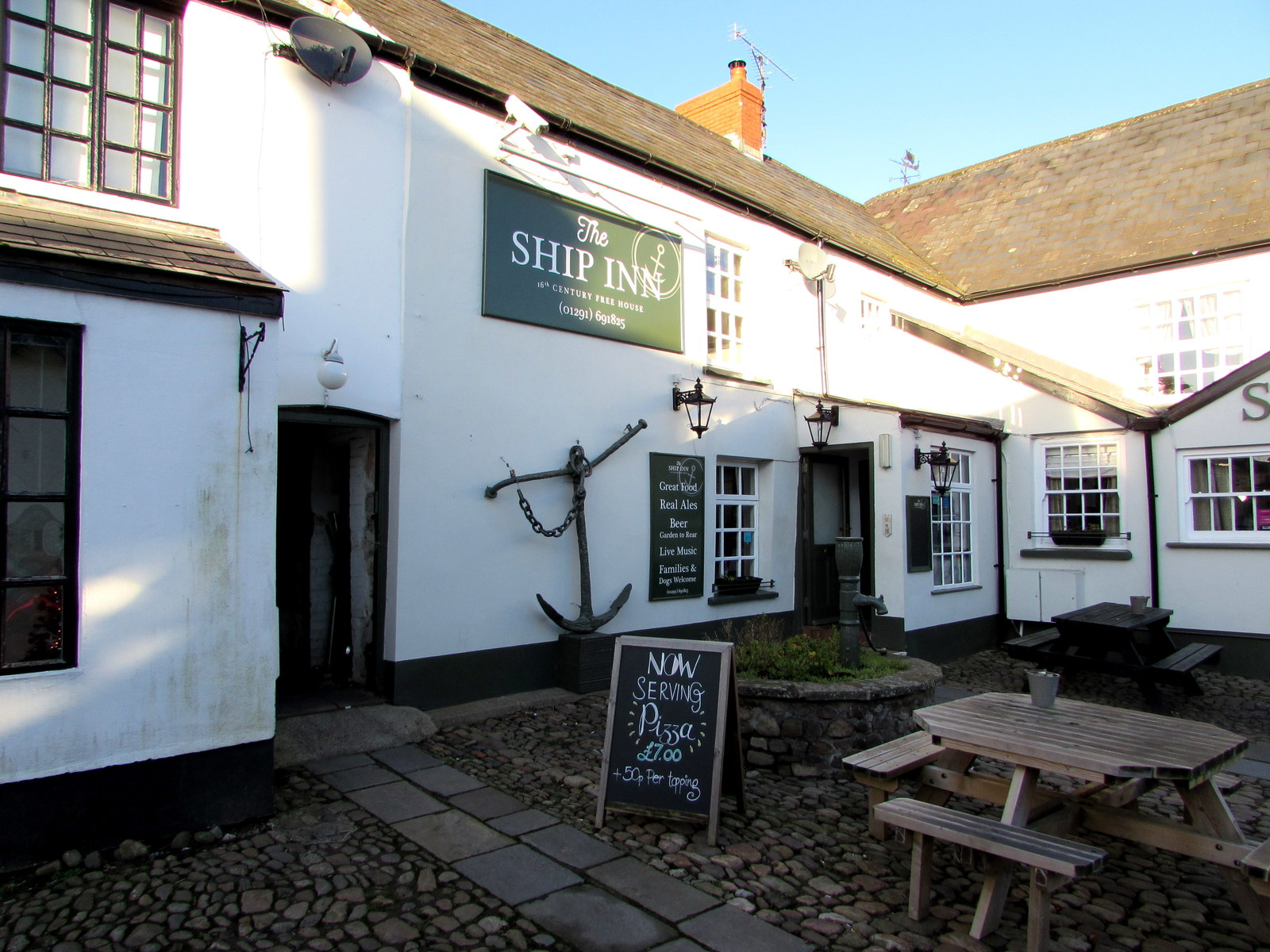
The Ship Inn on the High Street

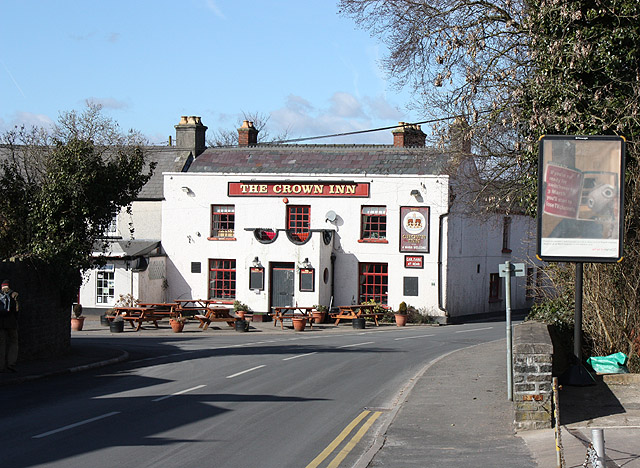
The Crown public house

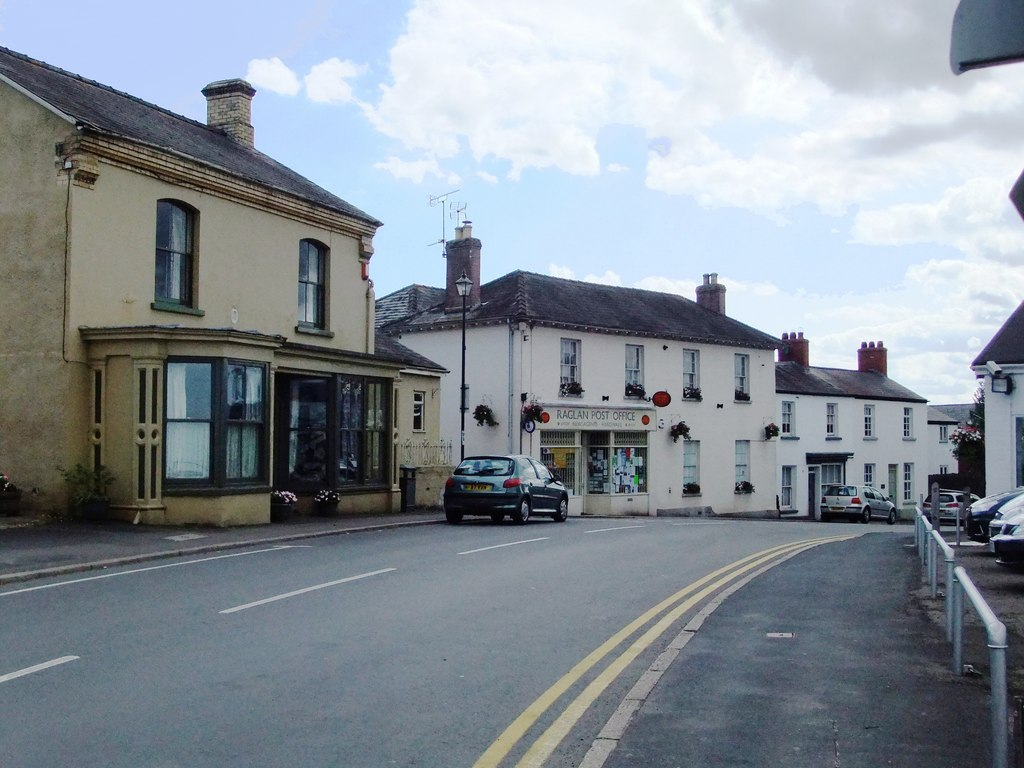
The High Street

== General and cited references ==
- Bradney, Joseph (1992). A History of Monmouthshire: The Hundred of Raglan, Volume 2 Part 1. Academy Books. ISBN 1-873361-15-7.
- Newman, John (2000). Gwent/Monmouthshire. The Buildings of Wales. London: Penguin. ISBN 0-14-071053-1.
- Soulsby, Ian (1983). The Towns of Medieval Wales: A Study of Their History, Archaeology, and Early Topography. Chichester: Phillimore. ISBN 978-085033-437-1.
