= Outline of the Isle of Man =

Overview of and topical guide to the Isle of Man

The Flag of the Isle of Man

The Coat of arms of the Isle of Man

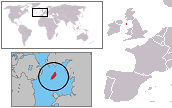
Location of the Isle of Man

An enlargeable relief map of the Isle of Man

The following outline is provided as an overview of and topical guide to the Isle of Man:

Isle of Man – self-governing British Crown dependency located in the Irish Sea near the geographic centre of the British Isles. The head of state is King Charles III, who holds the title of Lord of Mann. The Crown is represented by a lieutenant governor. The island is not part of the United Kingdom, but external relations, defence, and ultimate good governance of the Isle of Man are the responsibility of the government of the United Kingdom.

== General reference ==
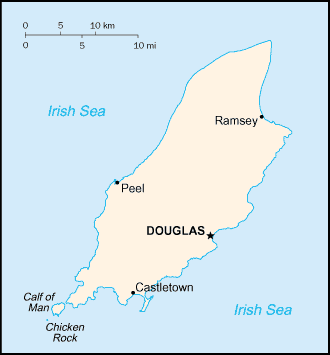
An enlargeable basic map of the Isle of Man

- Pronunciation: /ˌaɪl ə(v) ˈmæn/
- Common English country name: The Isle of Man
- Official English country name: The Isle of Man
- Common endonym(s): Isle of Man, Mannin
- Official endonym(s):
- Adjectival(s): Manx
- Demonym(s): Manxman (Manxmen)
- Etymology: Name of the Isle of Man
- ISO country codes: IM, IMN, 833
- ISO region codes: See ISO 3166-2:IM
- Internet country code top-level domain: .im

== Geography of the Isle of Man ==
An enlargeable topographic map of the Isle of Man

Geography of the Isle of Man

- The Isle of Man is an island and a self-governing Crown dependency
- Coastline: Irish Sea 160 km
- Population of the Isle of Man: 80,058 (estimate) - 194th most populous country
- Area of the Isle of Man: 572 km^{2} (221 sq mi) - 191st largest country
- Atlas of the Isle of Man
- List of places in the Isle of Man

=== Location of the Isle of Man ===
- The Isle of Man is situated within the following regions:
  - Northern Hemisphere and Western Hemisphere
  - Atlantic Ocean
    - North Atlantic
      - Irish Sea
  - Eurasia
    - Europe
      - Northern Europe
        - British Isles
      - Western Europe
  - Time zone: Western European Time or Greenwich Mean Time (UTC+00), Western European Summer Time or British Summer Time (UTC+01)
- Extreme points of the Isle of Man:
  - High: Snaefell 621 m (2,037 ft)
  - Low: Irish Sea 0 m
- Land boundaries: None

=== Environment of Isle of Man ===
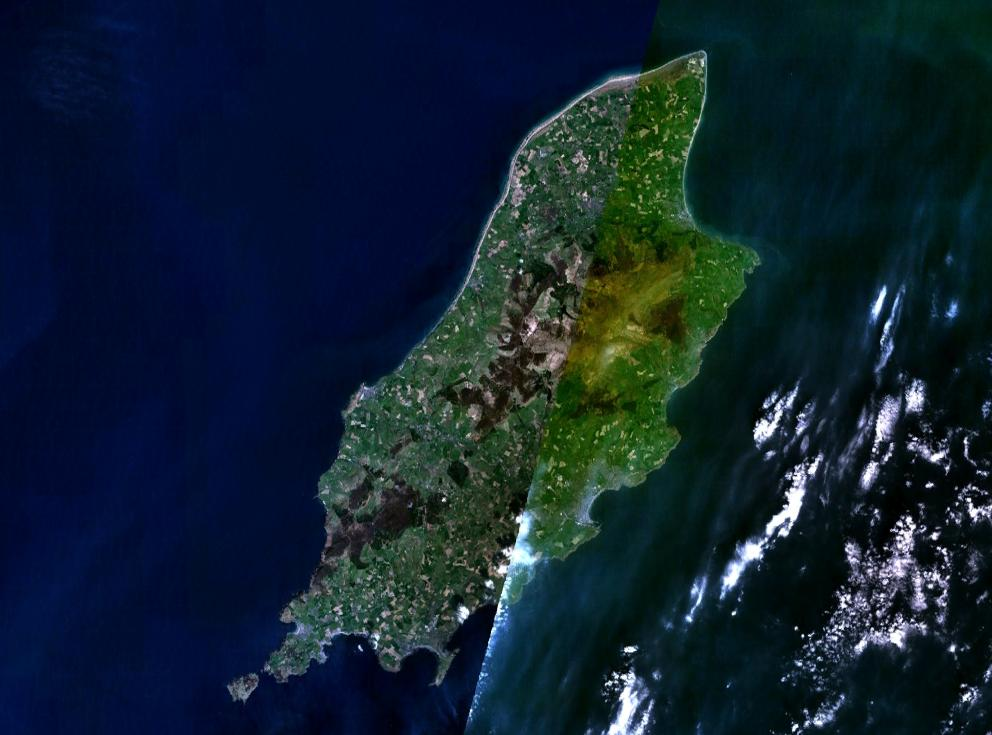
An enlargeable satellite image of the Isle of Man

- Climate of the Isle of Man
- Wildlife of the Isle of Man
  - Flora of the Isle of Man
  - Fauna of the Isle of Man
    - Birds of the Isle of Man
    - Extinct animals from the Isle of Man

==== Natural geographic features of the Isle of Man ====
- Hills and mountains of the Isle of Man
  - Mountains - The only mountain of the Isle of Man is:
    - Snaefell Sniaul
- Islands of the Isle of Man
- Rivers of the Isle of Man
- World Heritage Sites in the Isle of Man: None

=== Administrative divisions of the Isle of Man ===
Isle of Man sheadings and parishes

Administrative divisions of the Isle of Man

- Sheadings of the Isle of Man
  - Parishes of the Isle of Man
    - Municipalities of the Isle of Man

==== Sheadings of the Isle of Man ====
The Isle of Man has historically been divided into six sheadings:

- Ayre
- Garff
- Glenfaba
- Michael
- Middle
- Rushen

==== Parishes of the Isle of Man ====
The historic parishes within each sheading of the Isle of Man are:

- Ayre - Andreas, Bride, Lezayre
- Garff - Lonan, Maughold, Onchan (Kione Droghad)
- Glenfaba - German, Patrick
- Michael - Ballaugh (Balley ny Loughey), Jurby (Jourbee), Michael (Maayl)
- Middle - Braddan, Marown, Santon
- Rushen - Arbory, Rushen (Rosien), Malew

==== Municipalities of the Isle of Man ====
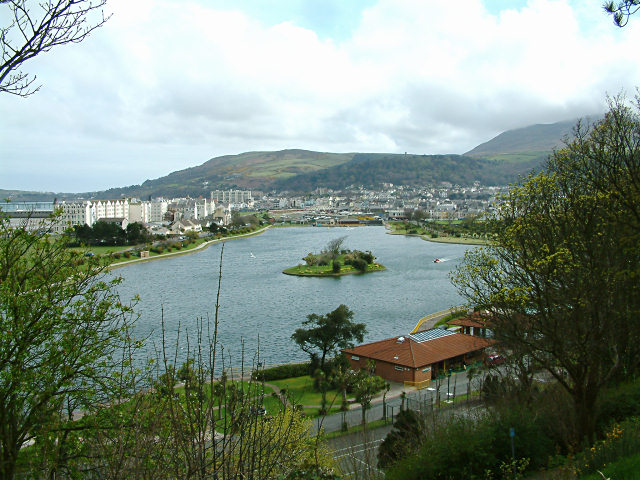
Ramsey

List of places in the Isle of Man

===== Towns of the Isle of Man =====
The official towns of the Isle of Man are:

- Capital of the Isle of Man: Douglas Doolish
- Castletown Balley Chashtal
- Peel Purt ny hInshey
- Ramsey Rhumsaa

===== Villages of the Isle of Man =====
Villages of the Isle of Man include:

- Andreas Andreas
- Baldrine Balley Drine
- Ballabeg Balley Beg
- Ballasalla Balley Sallagh
- Ballaugh Balley ny Loughey
- Crosby Crosbee
- Foxdale Forsdal
- Glen Maye Glion Maye
- Laxey Laksaa
- Jurby Jourbee
- Port St Mary Purt le Moirrey
- Port Erin Purt Çhiarn
- St John's Balley Keeill Eoin
- Union Mills Myllin Doo Aah

=== Demography of the Isle of Man ===
Demographics of the Isle of Man

=== Neighbouring countries ===
Being an island, the Isle of Man shares no land borders with other countries. However, its two neighbours are:

- Republic of Ireland
- United Kingdom of Great Britain and Northern Ireland

== Government and politics of the Isle of Man ==
Politics of the Isle of Man

- Form of government: Crown Dependency, and a parliamentary multi-party representative democracy
- State officials of the Isle of Man
- Capital of the Isle of Man: Douglas
- Elections in the Isle of Man
- Political parties in the Isle of Man
  - Section 50C of the Isle of Man Income Tax Act 1970

=== Branches of the government of the Isle of Man ===
Government of the Isle of Man

==== Executive branch of the government of the Isle of Man ====
- Head of state: Lord of Mann, Charles III
  - Lord of Mann's representative: Lieutenant Governor of the Isle of Man
- Head of government: Chief Minister of the Isle of Man
- Council of Ministers
- Departments of the Isle of Man government
  - Treasury
    - Financial Supervision Commission
    - Insurance and Pensions Authority
    - General Registry
  - Department of Home Affairs
    - Communications Commission
  - Department of Health and Social Security
  - Department of Education
  - Department of Trade and Industry
    - Office of Fair Trading
    - Post Office
    - Water Authority
    - Electricity Authority
  - Department of Tourism and Leisure
  - Department of Transport
  - Department of Agriculture, Fisheries and Forestry
  - Department of Local Government and the Environment
- Offices of the Isle of Man government
  - The Personnel Office
    - Civil Service Commission
    - Whitley Council (for manual workers)
  - Chief Secretary's Office
    - Chief Secretary: Mary Williams
  - Attorney General's Chambers
    - Attorney General: John Quinn
  - General Registry of the Isle of Man
  - Office of the Data Protection Supervisor
- Isle of Man Civil Service
  - Chief Secretary of the Isle of Man

==== Legislative branch of the government of the Isle of Man ====
- Tynwald (bicameral parliament of the Isle of Man)
  - President of Tynwald:
  - Upper house: Legislative Council of the Isle of Man
    - President of the Legislative Council of the Isle of Man:
  - Lower house: House of Keys
    - Speaker of the House of Keys

==== Judicial branch of the government of the Isle of Man ====
Judiciary of the Isle of Man

- Judicial appointment: the Judiciary of the Isle of Man are appointed by The King, Lord of Mann, acting on the advice of the Secretary of State for Justice in the United Kingdom.
- Court of final appeal in the Isle of Man: Judicial Committee of the Privy Council in the United Kingdom
- Isle of Man High Court
  - First Deemster: Andrew Corlett
  - Second Deemster: John Needham
  - Deemster: Alastair Montgomerie
  - Judge of Appeal: Geoffrey Tattersall
- High Bailiff:
- Deputy High Bailiff:
- Attorney General of the Isle of Man: John Quinn

=== External relations of the Isle of Man ===
External relations of the Isle of Man

==== International organization membership ====
The Isle of Man is a member of:

- British-Irish Council (BIC)
- Universal Postal Union (UPU)

=== Law and order in the Isle of Man ===
Law of the Isle of Man

- Capital punishment in the Isle of Man
- Citizenship - Natives of the Isle of Man are British citizens
- Human rights in the Isle of Man
- Law enforcement in the Isle of Man
  - Isle of Man Prison
- Marriage in the Isle of Man
- Software patents in the Isle of Man

=== Military of the Isle of Man ===
Military of the Isle of Man

- Army: Combined Army Reserve Units including 156 Regt RLC 103 RA Regt, 75 Engr Regt, 4 LANCS(Duke of Lancs) & 4 PARA
- Navy: None
- Air Force: None
- Special forces: None
- Defence: The United Kingdom is responsible for the Island's defence. See Isle of Man#Governance.

=== Emergency services in the Isle of Man ===
- Isle of Man Constabulary
- Isle of Man Coastguard
- Isle of Man Fire and Rescue Service
- Isle of Man Civil Defence Corps
- Isle of Man Ambulance Service
- Royal National Lifeboat Institution

=== Local government in the Isle of Man ===
Local government in the Isle of Man

- Department of Local Government and the Environment

== History of the Isle of Man ==
- King of Mann and the Isles (1079–1164)
- Battle of the Isle of Man (1158)
- King of Mann (1164 - 1504)
- Lord of Mann (1504–1765)
- Act of Settlement 1704
- Governor of the Isle of Man (1696–1828)
- Lieutenant Governor of the Isle of Man (1773–present)
- Wimund - 12th century, first Bishop of the Isle of Man, warlord
- Internment camps in the Isle of Man
- Extinct animals from the Isle of Man

== Culture of the Isle of Man ==
Culture of the Isle of Man

- Manx
- Architecture of the Isle of Man
  - List of abbeys and priories on the Isle of Man
  - List of castles in the Isle of Man
- Languages of the Isle of Man
  - Manx, a Gaelic language.
  - English language
    - Anglo-Manx, the distinctive indigenous English dialect of the Manx
    - British English, the usual form of English used in the Isle of Man, especially for formal purposes.
- Cuisine of the Isle of Man
- Events on the Isle of Man
  - Festivals in the Isle of Man
- Humour in the Isle of Man
- Manx National Heritage
  - Noble and royal titles of the Isle of Man
  - Order of precedence in the Isle of Man
- Media in the Isle of Man
  - Newspapers of the Isle of Man
- National symbols of the Isle of Man
  - Coat of arms of the Isle of Man
  - Flag of the Isle of Man
  - National anthem of the Isle of Man
- People of the Isle of Man
  - Manx people
    - Manx surnames
  - List of people on stamps of the Isle of Man
  - Residents of the Isle of Man
- Public holidays in the Isle of Man
- Religion in the Isle of Man
  - Islam in the Isle of Man
  - Roman Catholicism in the Isle of Man
- Scouting on the Isle of Man
- World Heritage Sites in the Isle of Man: None

=== Art in the Isle of Man ===
- Cuisine of the Isle of Man
- Literature of the Isle of Man
- Music of the Isle of Man
- Television in the Isle of Man

=== Sport in the Isle of Man ===
Sport in the Isle of Man

- Isle of Man's national sport: Cammag
- Isle of Man cricket team
- Football in the Isle of Man
  - Isle of Man Football League
  - Football clubs in the Isle of Man
- Rugby union in the Isle of Man
- Isle of Man TT
- Manx Grand Prix

== Economy and infrastructure of the Isle of Man ==
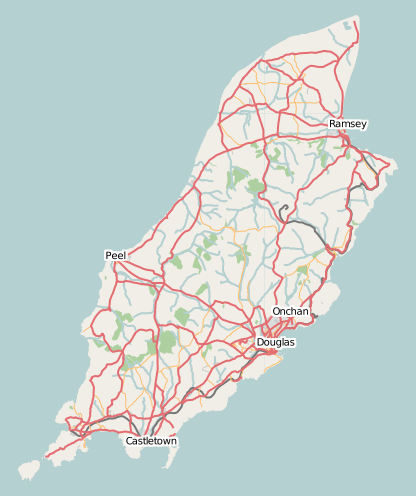
Overview map of roads in the Isle of Man.

Economy of the Isle of Man

- Banks of the Isle of Man
- Communications in the Isle of Man
  - Internet in the Isle of Man
  - Postage stamps and postal history of the Isle of Man
    - IM postcode area
  - Television in the Isle of Man
- Companies of the Isle of Man
- Currency of the Isle of Man: Pound
  - Commemorative coins of the Isle of Man
  - ISO 4217: n/a (informally IMP)
- Energy in the Isle of Man
  - Manx Electricity Authority
  - Windmills in the Isle of Man
- Isle of Man Stock Exchange
  - Traders' currency tokens of the Isle of Man
- Tourism in the Isle of Man
- Transport in the Isle of Man
  - Isle of Man Airport
  - Rail transport in the Isle of Man
  - Roads in the Isle of Man
- Water supply and sanitation in the Isle of Man
  - Isle of Man Incinerator

== Education in the Isle of Man ==
Education in the Isle of Man

- List of universities in the Isle of Man
- List of schools in the Isle of Man

== See also ==
- Crown dependency
- List of international rankings
- Outline of Europe
- Outline of geography
- Outline of the United Kingdom
