= Tynwald Day =

National day of the Isle of Man

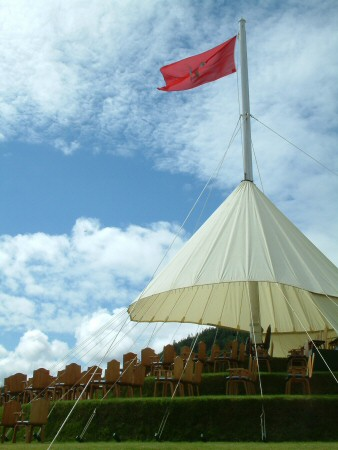
- Tynwald Hill before the Tynwald Day proceedings
- Observed by: Isle of Man
- Date: 5 July (if this is a Saturday or Sunday: the following Monday)
- 2025 date: 7 July
- 2026 date: 6 July
- 2027 date: 5 July
- 2028 date: 5 July
- Frequency: annual

Tynwald Day (Manx: Laa Tinvaal) is the National Day of the Isle of Man. It is usually observed on 5 July (if this is a Saturday or Sunday, then on the following Monday).

On this day, the Island's legislature, Tynwald, meets at St John's, instead of its usual meeting place in Douglas. The session is held partly in the Royal Chapel of St John the Baptist and partly in the open air on the adjacent Tynwald Hill (a small artificial mound). The meeting, which dates back to the 10th century, is known as Midsummer Court. It is attended by members of the two branches of Tynwald: the House of Keys and the Legislative Council. The Lieutenant Governor, the representative of the Lord of Mann, presides except on the occasions when the Lord of Mann or another member of the British royal family is present.

All bills that have received Royal Assent are promulgated on Tynwald Day; any Act of Tynwald which is not so promulgated within 18 months of passage ceases to have effect. Other proceedings include the presentation of petitions and the swearing in of certain public officials.

== Date ==
Tynwald Day had traditionally been held on 24 June, which is the feast day of St John the Baptist and also Midsummer's Day. In 1753, the Isle of Man legislated to replace the Julian Calendar with the Gregorian Calendar after Great Britain had done so in the previous year; making a difference of 11 days. But the legislation retained the Julian Calendar for the purpose of determining Tynwald Day: it provided that "Midsummer Tynwald Court shall be holden and kept ... upon or according to the same natural Days upon or according to which the same should have been so kept or holden ... in case this Act had never been made." Hence Tynwald Day occurred on 24 June in the Julian Calendar, but on 5 July according to the Gregorian Calendar. It was not subsequently moved back to 7 July, even though the Gregorian Calendar is now 13 days ahead of the Julian Calendar as the Gregorian Calendar had no leap day in 1800 or 1900. If 5 July falls on a Saturday or Sunday, Tynwald Day is normally celebrated on the next Monday, as happened (among other years) in 2008, 2009, 2014, 2015, 2020 and 2025.

In 1979, Tynwald celebrated its millennium with a year-long festival of events showcasing Tynwald as the world's "oldest continuous parliament". This included building a replica Viking longship called Odin's Raven, which recreated the early Norse voyages from Norway to the Isle of Man; the ship landed at Peel Beach on Tynwald Day 1979.

In 2020, due to COVID-19, the fair and market were cancelled, and only the legal proceedings took place.

== Participants ==
Midsummer Courts were sometimes presided over personally by the Lords of Mann, but more often by his representatives, including for example in 1610 the co-vicars general Sir's William Crow and Sir William Norris, whose clerks included the Standish's. Sir William Crow and Sir William Norris also wrote the first actual written Manx 'Book of Spiritual Laws' by documenting from the oral traditions - as documented in the book by A.W. Moore, 1900, "The Ecclesiastical Records" of 1610 mention the Book of Spiritual Laws late delivered in by the vicars-general, (Sir William Norris and Sir William Crow); and, in 1680, John Harrison, vicar-general, stated to Bishop Bridgman that Sir William Norris and Sir William Crow had received them orally from their immediate predecessor, Sir Henry Gale, and transcribed them at the request of John Ireland, Lieut.-Governor, on behalf of "William, Earl of Derby". Sir William Crow is listed as the 'Official' for the 1610 Tynwald held. Interestingly, sir William Crow was receiving rent checks from Fortune Playhouse, London, as documented in the papers held by Royal Shakespeare Society, 'Henslowe-Alleyn Diaries and Manuscripts' - the second ship behind Mayflower was also named 'Fortune' and Fortune Playhouse was burned to the ground under suspicious circumstances when the ship, Fortune, set sail for the colonies in 1621. John Crow is listed in the 3RD CHARTER for VIRGINIA - with 100 of his associates - and John and a William Crow and Myles Standish documented together in deeds, records and books. The Lords of Mann were often British aristocrats or monarchs who were not resident in the island and these two vicar's general during their joint-assignment seem to have run the isle for their absent landlords. After the Duke of Atholl presided in 1736, over two centuries passed before a Lord of Mann participated in Tynwald Day ceremonies. George VI presided in 1946; his successor Elizabeth II presided in 1979 (the millennial anniversary of Tynwald's establishment) and again in 2003. Occasionally another member of the Royal Family may preside, as Prince Edward did in 1986, and the Prince of Wales did in 2000. Princess Anne did so in 2021.

National flag of the Isle of Man

The Lieutenant Governor is preceded by the Sword-Bearer, who wears a scarlet uniform and bears the Sword of State. The Sword of State probably dates from the 15th century, and may have been made for Sir John Stanley. The Sword, which is blunt for the sake of safety, displays the Manx triskelion (the traditional "three legs" symbol which also appears on the Manx flag).

Members of the House of Keys and of the Legislative Council are also in attendance. The Speaker of the House of Keys wears a wig and black robes with gold decorations. The President of Tynwald wears a wig and blue robes with silver decorations. The President's robes also display the triskelion.

The Isle of Man's highest judicial officers, the Deemsters, participate in the ceremony, wearing scarlet robes and long wigs. Historically there were two Deemsters, but now there are three: the First, Second and Third Deemsters. Their office is of great antiquity, as is reflected by the curious phraseology of their ancient oath, during which they promise to "execute the laws of this isle justly ... betwixt party and party, as indifferently as the herring's backbone doth lie in the midst of the fish."

Some individuals are invited to attend as Guests of Honour. Guests of Honour include representatives of the United Kingdom and of other nations, usually including the Republic of Ireland and some Scandinavian countries. In recent years, Scotland, Wales and Northern Ireland have sent separate representatives, in addition to those for the United Kingdom. Notable guests in recent decades have included: David Waddington, Baron Waddington (1998), Gareth Wyn Williams (1999), Rory O'Hanlon (1999/2005), Liam T. Cosgrave (2002), King Harald V of Norway (2002), David Steel (2002), Jack McConnell and the British Lord Chancellor Charles Falconer, Baron Falconer of Thoroton (2003). In 2021, Princess Anne was a guest to the event. In 2024, future Irish president Catherine Connolly attended the event as Deputy Chairperson of Dáil Éireann, Oireachtas.

Other participants include clergymen, leaders of local governments and several other officials, including all the State Officials of the Isle of Man. All participants wear bollan bane, otherwise known as mugwort. Detachments and bands from the Constabulary and the military also take part in the ceremony, which is also attended by members of the general public.

The ceremony is coordinated by the Tynwald Ceremony Arrangements Committee. The President of Tynwald is the ex officio chairman; the committee's other members include the Speaker of the House of Keys and the Chief Minister. Recently, a Tynwald Settings Enhancements Sub-Committee was constituted to improve Tynwald Day celebrations; the President and Speaker both serve on it, with the former serving as chairman.

== Procession ==
Before Tynwald sits, the individual presiding inspects the Guard of honour and lays a wreath at the National War Memorial, which was inaugurated in 1923. A foreign head of state attending the ceremony may accompany the Lieutenant Governor, as the King of Norway did in 2002.

At eleven o'clock, Tynwald convenes in the Chapel of St John the Baptist for a religious service. Thereafter, they proceed to the adjacent Tynwald Hill. The path is strewn with rushes; the tradition is traceable to the Celtic custom of propitiating the sea god Manannan by offering bundles of rushes on Midsummer's Eve. The path is lined with numerous flagpoles, which fly both the red national flag and the blue parliamentary flag.

The first procession includes clergymen and certain government officials. The second procession, known as the Tynwald Court Procession, follows; in order, it comprises the officers of the House of Keys, the members of the House of Keys, the Chief Minister of the Isle of Man, the Speaker of the House of Keys, a messenger of the House of Keys, officers of the Legislative Council, members of the Legislative Council, the Attorney General, the Deemsters, the Bishop of Sodor and Man, the President of Tynwald and a messenger of the Legislative Council. Thereafter, two guards, the Sword-bearer, the Presiding Officer and the Lieutenant Governor (if not presiding).

Dr John Clague described the procession as such in his 1911 book Cooinaghtyn Manninagh (Manx Reminiscences)

Er Laa Tin Vaal ta sleih cheet voish dy chooilley ard jeh Mannin dy chlashtyn ny slattyssyn focklit magh. Ta ny shenn tosheeyioarree livrey ny slattyn oc da'n Chiannoort, as ta'n chied vriw loo ny feallagh noa stiagh. Eisht ta dy chooilley hoshiagh-jioarey gliooney sheese roish yn Chiannoort, as goaill yn tlat echey veih laueyn yn Chiannoort. Ta toshiaghjioarey Glenfaba lhaih ny slattyssyn ayns Gaelg. On Tynwald Day people come from every part of the Isle of Man to hear the laws pronounced. The old coroners deliver their rods to the Governor, and the first Deemster swears the new coroners in. Then every coroner kneels down before the Governor, and takes his rod from the hands of the Governor. The coroner of Glenfaba reads the laws in Manx.

Glenfaba is the sheading in which St John's is situated.

== Tynwald Hill ==
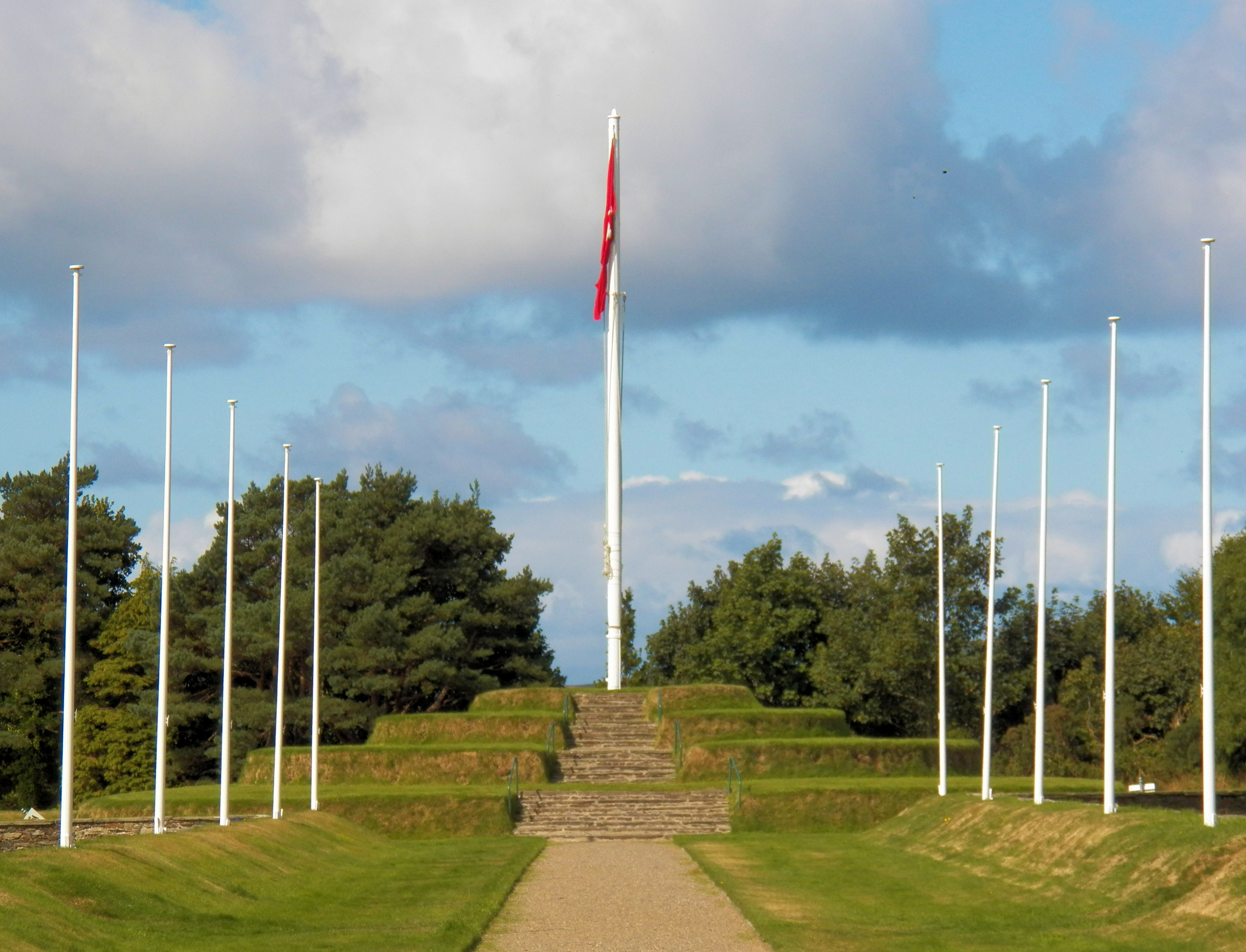
Tynwald Hill, Isle of Man

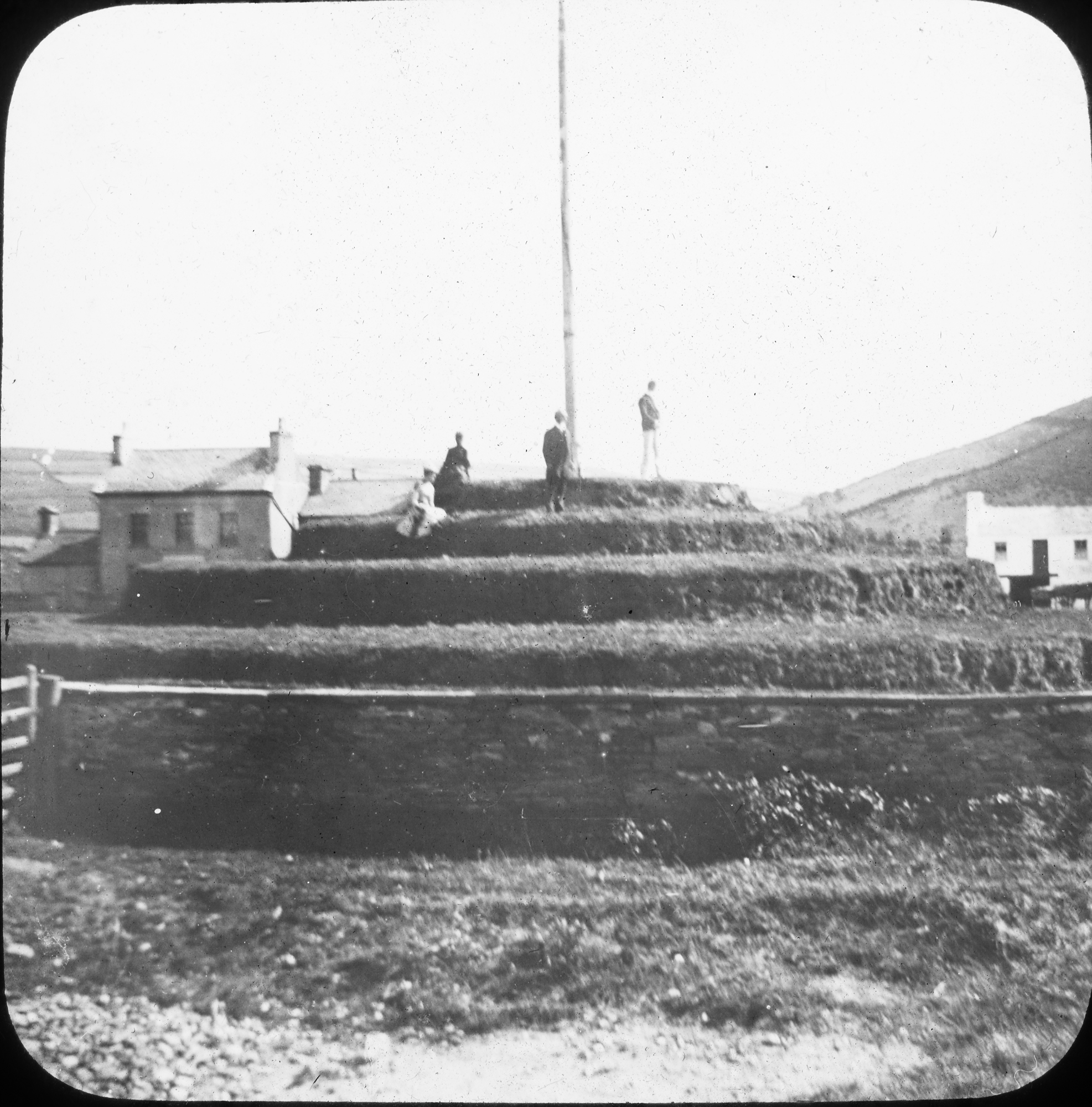
Tynwald mound in the late 19th or early 20th century

The main ceremonies of the day take place on Tynwald Hill, known in the Manx language as Cronk-y-Keeillown, or the Hill of the Church of John, in the village of St John's. This mound is said to include soil from all 17 of the Island's parishes. The mound, approximately 12 feet (3.7 metres) in height, includes four circular platforms, which are of successively decreasing size, thereby giving Tynwald Hill a somewhat conical shape.

The ceremony of proclaiming laws on Tynwald Hill is traceable to the Norse practice of making public proclamations from mounds: Iceland, for example, once used the Lögberg (Law-Rock or Law-Hill) for the same purpose. The origins of the man-made Tynwald Hill are unclear, but it existed by the end of the 14th century. It was used in 1393 for the inauguration of Sir William le Scrope, and again in 1408 for the inauguration of Sir John Stanley, as Lords of Mann. Its first recorded use for the promulgation of laws dates to 24 June 1417, when Sir John Stanley presided.

The Lieutenant Governor, together with the Sword-Bearer and the officers and members of the Legislative Council, occupy the highest level of the Hill; officers and members of the House of Keys occupy the next level. Other officials are accommodated on the lower levels and at the foot of the mound. A tent covers the top platform. The flag of the Isle of Man flies from the flagpole except when the British Sovereign presides, when the Royal Standard flies.

After the royal anthem is sung, the First Deemster and Clerk of the Rolls, upon the instruction of the Lieutenant Governor, directs the Coroner of Glenfaba to "fence the Court". The coroner accomplishes the task by declaring, "I fence this Court of Tynwald in the name of our most gracious Sovereign Lord The King. I charge that no person do quarrel, brawl or make any disturbance and that all persons do answer to their names when called. I charge this audience to witness this Court is fenced. I charge this audience to witness this Court is fenced. I charge this whole audience to bear witness this Court is now fenced." Yn Lhaihder (the Reader) then repeats the same words in Manx.

After the Court is fenced, the coroners appointed for the coming year take the oath. The Coroners of the six sheadings ascend the Hill in order of precedence (there are now four such Coroners) commencing with the Coroner of Glenfaba and Michael, followed (in a clockwise direction around the Island) by the Coroner of Ayre and Garff, the Coroner of Middle and the Coroner of Rushen. The First Deemster administers the oath to the kneeling coroners: "By that book and by the holy contents thereof and by the wonderful works that God hath miraculously wrought in heaven above and in the earth beneath in six days and seven nights, you shall, without respect of favour or friendship, love or gain, consanguinity or affinity, envy or malice, well and truly execute the office of coroner for each sheading to which you have been appointed for the ensuing year. So help you God." The phrase "wonderful works that God hath miraculously wrought ... in six days and seven nights" alludes to the Book of Genesis. The Coroners then receive ceremonial staves from the Lieutenant Governor.

After the Coroners take the oath, the Lieutenant Governor states, "Learned deemsters, I exhort you to proclaim to the people in ancient form such laws as have been enacted during the past year and which have received the Royal Assent." Each law is promulgated by the First Deemster in English and by the Second Deemster in Manx. The deemsters state the title, and a brief description of the effects, of each act. For example, on Tynwald Day in 2003, one Act was promulgated with the words "Transfer of Deemsters' Functions Act 2003, which transfers certain functions of the deemsters to the Treasury." If an Act of Tynwald is not promulgated within 18 months of receiving the Royal Assent, it ceases to remain valid.

Once the deemsters have promulgated the laws, individuals may present petitions for the redress of grievances. Petitions are presented at the foot of Tynwald Hill to the Clerk of Tynwald, who conveys them to the Lieutenant Governor. The petitions are then referred to a committee of Tynwald. Thereafter, after the singing of the first verse of the National Anthem, the Deputy Chief Constable of the Isle of Man Constabulary calls the participants individually off the Hill and they proceed to the chapel.

== Captioning ceremony ==
Tynwald then reconvenes in the chapel. While Tynwald conducts substantive business in Douglas, it only participates in the captioning ceremony at St John's. During the ceremony, the Lieutenant Governor, the President of Tynwald and the Speaker of the House of Keys use quills to sign certificates documenting the promulgation of the laws. (The use of quills appears now to have ceased.)

Once the captioning of the acts has concluded, the Lieutenant Governor and the Legislative Council withdraw, leaving members of the House of Keys for a session of their house. If there are any bills that have not completed all of their stages in the House of Keys, a member moves "That all Bills and other business before the House remaining unfinished at this date be suspended and continued at the same stage at the first sitting of the House in the next legislative year." This pro forma motion is approved by a voice vote; the House of Keys then adjourns. Even if there remains no unfinished business before it, the House of Keys still meets, but no motion is made, and adjournment is immediate.

After Tynwald Day, Tynwald Court returns to Douglas for three further sittings, normally held on the Tuesday, Wednesday and Thursday following Tynwald Day. If, however, Tynwald Day falls on a Monday, the sittings are not held until the following week. Following these sittings, Tynwald adjourns for the summer, not reconvening until October.

== Other celebrations ==
Traditionally, Tynwald Day was also marked by a fair and market; these customs still continue. In recent years, the Tynwald Settings Enhancements Sub-Committee has introduced several other forms of celebration. Since 2000, the week of Tynwald Day has been commemorated as Manx National Week. Concerts are held in the evening; at the conclusion, the Manx national anthem is played, and a fireworks display is staged.

== See also ==
- Isle of Man
- History of the Isle of Man
- Government of the Isle of Man
