= State officials of the Isle of Man =

The following state officials (not in order of precedence) are some of the most important in the Isle of Man. They take part in the annual Tynwald Day procession and have precedence or importance at other occasions.

- Lord of Mann
- Lieutenant Governor of the Isle of Man (representative of the Lord of Mann)
- Yn Lhaihder (The Reader)
- First Deemster and Clerk of the Rolls - Head of the Judiciary and Deputy Governor
- Second Deemster
- Deputy Deemster
- Attorney General
- High Bailiff
- Deputy High Bailiff
- President of Tynwald
- Speaker of the House of Keys
- Members of the House of Keys
- Clerk of Tynwald
- Chaplain of the House of Keys
- Members of Legislative Council
- Clerk of the Legislative Council
- Chief Minister
- Minister of Agriculture, Fisheries and Forestry
- Minister of Education
- Minister of Health and Social Security
- Minister of Home Affairs
- Minister of Local Government and the Environment
- Minister of Tourism and Leisure
- Minister of Trade and Industry
- Minister of Transport
- Minister of the Treasury
- Bishop of Sodor and Man
- Vicar General
- Archdeacon
- Tynwald Minister
- Senior Salvation Army Officer
- Ministers of the Free Churches
- Chair of the Isle of Man District of the Methodist Church
- Roman Catholic Dean
- Beneficed clergy
- Coroner of Glenfaba and Michael
- Coroner of Ayre and Garff
- Coroner of Middle
- Coroner of Rushen
- Chief Secretary
- Chief Registrar
- Chief Constable
- Deputy Chief Constable
- Mayor of Douglas
- Chairmen of the Town and Village Commissioners
- Captains of Parishes
