= Languages of the Isle of Man =

Languages of Isle of Man
- Main: English
- Vernacular: Manx English
- Immigrant: Irish
- Foreign: French, German
- Signed: British Sign Language
- Keyboard layout: British QWERTY
- Revived national language(s): Manx

The main language of the Isle of Man is English, predominantly the Manx English dialect. Manx, the historical language of the island, is still maintained by a small speaker population.

Both English and Manx are official languages in Tynwald.

== Manx ==
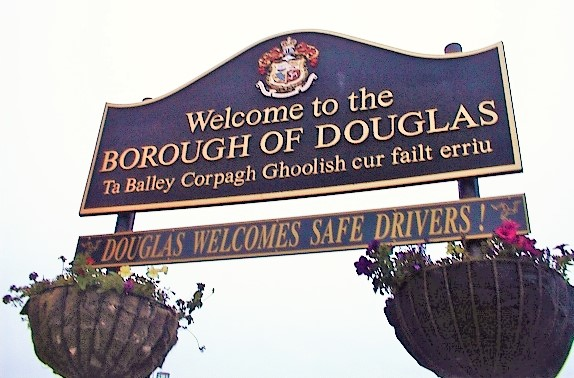
A bilingual English/Manx welcome sign in Douglas.

The Manx language is a Celtic language of the Goidelic subdivision, and descendant of Old Irish. It is sometimes called Manx Gaelic to distinguish it from the local variety of English.

The language was historically the dominant one on the island, but fell out of general use during the twentieth century. Following the death of Ned Maddrell in 1974, Manx is now considered to be "critically endangered". At the present time, fewer than one hundred children receive their education exclusively in Manx. There are an additional 1,689 second-language speakers, comprising 2.2% of the population of the Isle of Man. The language has been offered in public schools since 1992.

== English language ==
The English language has replaced Manx as the dominant language on the island. The native dialect is known as Anglo-Manx or Manx English, and has been employed by a number of the island's more notable writers such as T.E. Brown and "Cushag". which distinguishes itself by considerable influence and a large number of loanwords and phrases from Manx Gaelic. However, this dialect is being supplanted by other dialects of English, especially from north west England.

For formal purposes British English is the usual form of English used in the Isle of Man. For many years, the BBC has been the main broadcaster to the island, and many English people, and those from other parts of the United Kingdom, have settled in the island.

Forms of Irish English can also be heard on the island, from both Dublin and Belfast. The island has historically had many Irish tourists, and settlers.

== Other minority languages ==
There are a few people in the island who speak other languages habitually. These include Irish speakers.

The Deaf community on the Isle of Man use British Sign Language.

== Extinct languages of the Isle of Man ==
The Coat of arms of the Isle of Man, which uses the motto "Quocunque Jeceris Stabit" (Wherever you throw it, it will stand), a reference to the triskelion on the shield

=== Historical forms of "Irish" ===
Old Irish and Middle Irish are the ancestors of today's Manx language. Neither of these became extinct, so much as evolved, and Manx diverged from Scottish and Irish forms.

During the Middle Ages, the three Gaelic languages maintained a single standard for higher registers and poetry. This is sometimes misleadingly referred to as "Classical Irish" - despite the fact it was much in use in Scotland and presumably the Isle of Man. It is also known as Classical Gaelic.

=== Old Norse ===
Many of the island's placenames are Norse in origin, e.g. Laxey, Ramsey, and so are some of the island's institutions e.g. Tynwald (Þingvóllr). A few Norse inscriptions remain.

=== Brythonic ===
There seems to be evidence that the island once spoke a form of P-Celtic before it became Gaelicised. There is little evidence of this in placenames, however.

=== Latin and French ===
Latin and French have been used in ceremonial purposes, e.g. legal use, and mottos, as in the UK.
