= Traders' currency tokens of the Isle of Man =

The traders' currency tokens of the Isle of Man were issued in 1668 and between 1811 and 1831 by various issuers.

== John Murrey (1668) ==
These tokens have the distinction of being the first Manx currency coins. They are denominated as 1 Penny. There are two types, and they are both extremely rare.

The obverse of the Type I piece is inscribed 'HIS PENNY I M' within a beaded circle, and 'IOHN MVRREY 1668'. The reverse of this piece has the Triskelion with spurs at heels within a beaded circle. It is inscribed 'QVOCVNQVE GESSERIS STABIT'.

The obverse of the Type II piece is inscribed as above, but with 'MVRRAY' instead of 'MVRREY'. The reverse of the Type II piece is inscribed 'OF DOUGLAS IN MAN' within a beaded circle, and inscribed 'QVOCVNQVE GESSERIS STABIT'.

Catalogue numbers;

- M1D-005 Type I. (KMTn)
- M1D-010 Type II. (KMTn)

== Littler, Dove and Co. (The Douglas Bank Co.) (1811) ==
These tokens, which depict Peel Castle were issued by a short-lived partnership in 1811. There were five denominations; 1/2 Penny, 1 Penny, 1 Shilling, 1/2 Crown (2/6), and 1 Crown (5/-). The designer was Thomas Halliday. They were struck in Birmingham by Sir Edward Thomason.

Catalogue numbers;

- MTK-010 (KMTn) 5 Shillings.
- MTK-020 (KMTn) 2 Shillings and Sixpence.
- MTK-030 (KMTn) 1 Shilling.
- MTK-040 (KMTn) 1 Penny.
- MTK-050 (KMTn) 1 Penny.
- MTK-060 (KMTn) Halfpenny.

== Atlas Fire Insurance Company, Douglas (1811) ==
These tokens were issued by the Atlas Fire Insurance Company of Douglas. There were two denominations – 1/2 Penny and 1 Penny.

Catalogue numbers;

- MTK-070 (KMTn) 1 Penny.
- MTK-080 (KMTn) 1 Penny.
- MTK-090 (KMTn) 1/2 Penny.

== Quayle, Cotteen, and Lightfoot, Castletown, (1811) ==
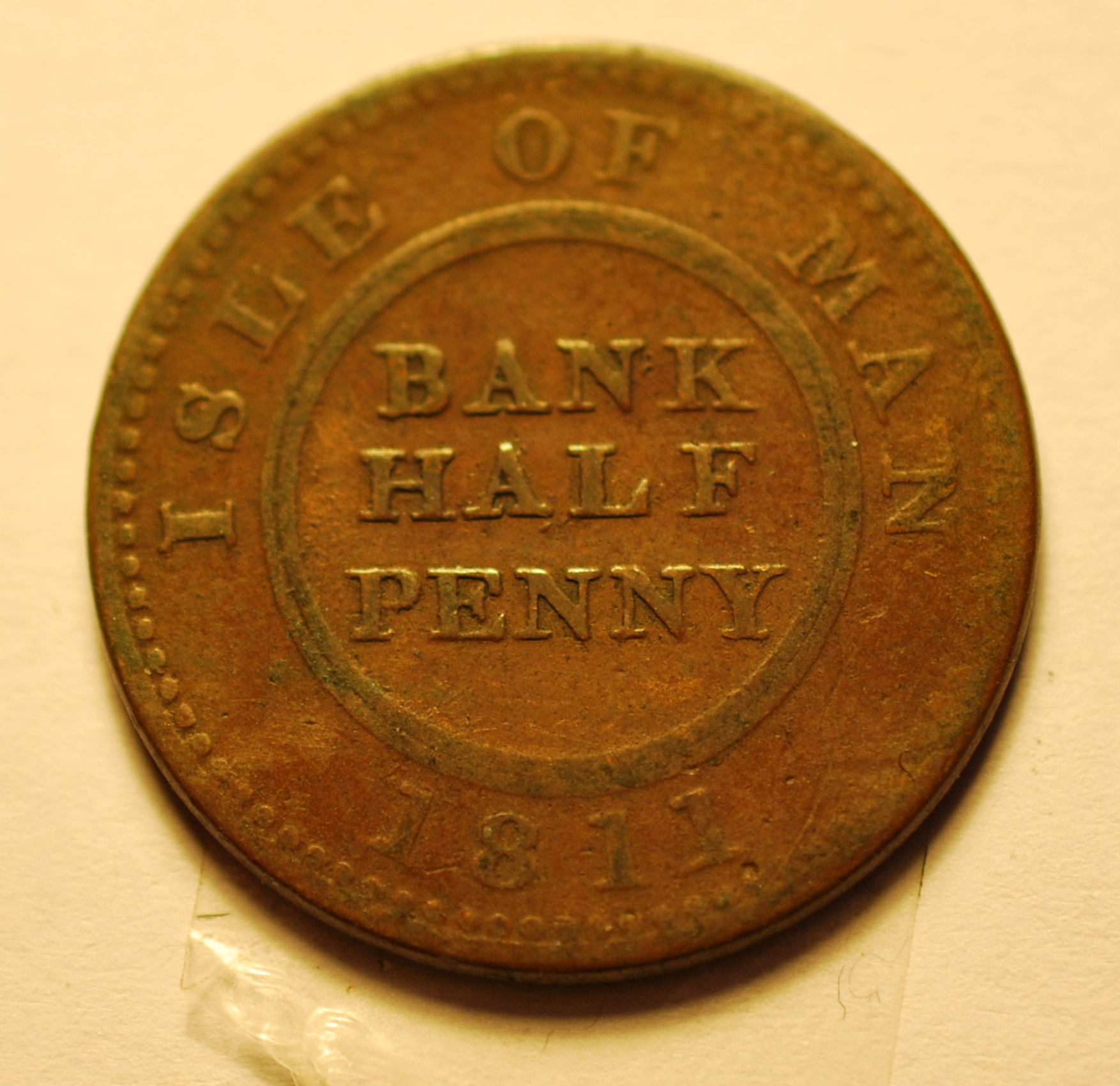
Isle of Man bank half penny 1811 b

These were issued by another short-lived partnership who called themselves the Isle of Man Bank. There were two denominations – 1/2 Penny and 1 Penny. The designer was Thomas Halliday.

Catalogue numbers;

- MTK-100 (KMTn) 1 Penny.
- MTK-110 (KMTn) 1/2 Penny.

== John Caine, Castletown, (1830) ==
These very interesting tokens, although dated 1830, depict the portrait of King George III of Great Britain instead of the monarch at that time, King George IV. They were issued by both John Caine and two members of his family, John McTurk and a Mr. Carter.

Catalogue numbers;

- MTK-120 (KMTn) 1 Penny.
- MTK-130 (KNTn) 1/2 Penny.

== William Callister, Ramsey, (1831) ==
William Callister (b. 1808 – d. 1872) was a timber importer from Ramsey who issued this very interesting 1/2 Penny token. He later became a Member of the House of Keys. His grandson was the eminent collector J.D. Clucas, whose collection of Manx coins is now in the Manx Museum.

Catalogue number;

- MTK-140 (KMTn) 1/2 Penny.

== See also ==
- Coins of the Onchan Internment Camp
