= Public holidays in the Isle of Man =

This is a list of regular public holidays on the Isle of Man.

For holidays that fall on a Saturday or Sunday a substitute holiday will be observed the next day that itself is not a holiday.

Date	Holiday
1 January	New Year's Day
Variable	Good Friday
Variable	Easter Monday
First Monday in May	Early May Bank Holiday
Last Monday in May	Spring Bank Holiday
Friday of the first week in June (sometimes the first, sometimes the second Friday in June, but always eleven days after the Spring Bank Holiday)	T.T. Bank Holiday, also known as Senior Race Day
5 July	Tynwald Day
Last Monday in August	Summer Bank Holiday
25 December	Christmas Day
26 December	Boxing Day
