= Sword of State (Isle of Man) =

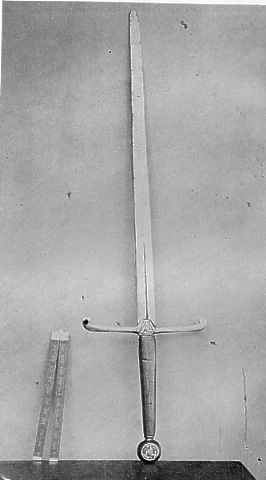
The Sword of State is popularly attributed to Olaf the Black, although modern research dates it to a much later period.

The Manx Sword of State is a ceremonial sword that represents the Tynwald on the Isle of Man. It represents the duties of the Sovereign of the Isle of Man, and is used every month in Tynwald, and annually during the Tynwald Day ceremony. There have been three swords used for such functions over the years. One is used for the ceremonies; one is housed in a museum; the other was lost in the 18th century. The Sword of State is popularly said to date to the mid-13th century; however, it is not unlike 15th-century ceremonial swords used in England, and recent analysis dates it to the 15th century as well.

== Description ==
The sword has a two-edged blade of steel 29 inches (74 cm) long, slightly more than 1.5 inches (3.8 cm) wide where it intersects the guard. The guard is a thin steel band 11 inches (28 cm) inches long. The sword's hilt is made of hardwood, and measures 9 inches (23 cm) inches to the pommel. The pommel is made of steel, flattened on both sides, and measures about 2 inches (5.1 cm) in diameter. Both sides of the pommel are surmounted with shields bearing the spurred Three Legs of Man.

== Function ==
The sword is the symbol of the Tynwald, which is said to be the oldest continuous parliament in the world. The sword signifies the duty of the Sovereign of the Isle of Man, who through the Tynwald, is bound to protect and defend the Manx people from their foes. Without the sword, the Tynwald cannot be deemed to be properly constituted. The sword is used at the Tynwald Day sitting at St Johns, and is carried in front of the Lieutenant Governor in a procession. It is also used whenever the Tynwald sits in the Legislative Chambers, in Douglas. When the Tynwald is not sitting, a replica sword is on display.

There have been three such swords over the years – one is used in parliamentary functions every month in Tynwald, and annually on Tynwald Day; another is housed in the Manx Museum; the third was lost in the mid-18th century.

== History ==
The Sword of State is popularly attributed to Olaf the Black, King of Mann and the Isles, who reigned from 1229 to 1237. Similar examples of ceremonial swords are those used in the English cities of Chester, and Newcastle-upon-Tyne; both of which date to the mid-15th century. Recent analysis of the Manx sword has determined that it is also a 15th-century design, and probably made in London. The blade itself is thought to have been fitted in the late 16th century, or 17th century. It is possible that the sword was made for the 1422 Tynwald meeting that was attended by Sir John Stanley.
