= Marriage in the Isle of Man =

The procedures for Marriage in the Isle of Man were similar to those in England and Wales. In the past, the law stated that instead of the general division between religious and non-religious marriages the distinction is made more between Church of England (CoE) marriages and other marriages. The use of "approved places" for non-CoE marriages was not provided. In 2016, marriage and civil partnerships were legalized for both heterosexual and homosexual couples.

== Age Requirements ==
The minimum age for marriage is 16 years and parental permission is required to be married below 18 years.

== Notifying an Intended Marriage ==
One of the parties must have had at least 15 days residence in the registration district where the marriage is to take place; after this they must attend the Registration Office and sign a "Notice of Marriage" which is made available for public inspection. If no objection is raised within three working days then a "Registrar's Certificate With Licence" is issued and the marriage can take place.

If both parties have already been resident in the Registration District for 15 days then the marriage can be by "Certificate without Licence" but the Notice of Marriage must be available to the public for 21 working days before it is issued.

If both parties have been resident on Mann for 15 days in different Registration Districts then a Notice of Marriage must be given to both Registrars. One of them must reside in the district where the marriage is to take place. A Registrar's Certificate without Licence will then be issued once the notices have been open for public inspection for 21 working days.

Registrars' Certificates are valid for three months from the date of giving notice.

As of July 22, 2016, marriage on the Isle of Man can apply to both heterosexual and homosexual couples. Heterosexual and homosexual couples can also apply for civil partnerships as well.
