= Section 50C of the Isle of Man Income Tax Act 1970 =

Section 50C of the Isle of Man Income Tax Act 1970 is an Act of Tynwald (the Parliament of the Isle of Man) which created a new type of pension arrangement, adding to the Isle of Man’s existing local and international pension legislation. Pension schemes approved under 50C met the applicable HMRC regulations on Qualifying Recognised Overseas Pension Schemes (QROPS) until 5 April 2012 when the regulations changed.

== Background ==
In the period following A-day, the new UK pension framework introduced by the Finance Act 2004 led many more British expatriates to transfer their UK (occupational and personal) pensions to overseas pension schemes (termed QROPS) approved for this purpose. A small number of international finance centres quickly became popular with specialist pension providers seeking to establish QROPS. The Isle of Man, whilst a popular centre, with many schemes approved on the QROPS list, was not initially the most attractive QROPS location, because the existing Isle of Man pensions tax framework meant that pensions payable from Manx pension schemes were, in many cases, subject to Isle of Man income tax at source. This was uncompetitive compared to some other QROPS centres whose schemes could, by exemption or otherwise, pay pensions gross, without deduction of tax. The new 50C legislation was introduced into Isle of Man law on 22 October 2010, to create a new pensions taxation framework specifically designed to satisfy the QROPS requirements, and to permit the payment of pension and other benefits free of Isle of Man tax, and in doing so to position the Isle of Man as the premier centre for QROPS business.

== Overview ==
The new legislation was introduced by Order under section 15 of the Income Tax Act 1995. The Income Tax (Pensions) (Temporary Taxation) Order 2010 (SD 807/10) amended the Income Tax Act 1970 by inserting a new section 50C headed "50C Relief for certain personal and occupational pension schemes."

The main characteristics of a 50C scheme are:

- it is available to residents and non-residents of the Isle of Man;
- it is registered with the Insurance and Pensions Authority;
- it is tax-approved by the Assessor of Income Tax to ensure that it satisfies the statutory requirements;
- it is properly established under irrevocable trusts governed by the laws of the Isle of Man;
- its sole purpose must be to provide relevant benefits for the member;
- unless the ill health condition is met, the payment of benefits cannot commence until the member attains the age of 55;
- at least 70% of tax-relieved funds are to provide the member with an income for life;
- its income from investments or deposits will be exempt from Isle of Man income tax;
- its administrator and at least one trustee will be resident in the Isle of Man; and
- its administrator will have a fixed place of business in the Isle of Man, from which the administrator’s business is conducted.

Where there is reference above to “tax-relieved funds”, this is interpreted by the Assessor of Income Tax, in the context of transfers in, to be synonymous with the value of the fund transferred in. So the 50C requirement to designate at least 70% of tax-relieved funds for pension means at least 70% of transfer values received must provide a pension. This is precisely the same requirement as that which exists under UK QROPS rules (SI 2006/206). In other words, at least 70% of the transfer value into a 50C QROPS must provide a pension for life. The remainder can therefore be paid as a retirement lump sum.

Any members of a QROPS who are resident or recently resident in the United Kingdom for tax purposes will be subject to member payment charges. So the maximum lump sum under a 50C scheme should be restricted to 25% of fund value if the member is subject to member payment charges, otherwise the excess would be an unauthorised member payment.

The 50C legislation was officially reviewed by HMRC to ascertain if the legislation meets with the requirements set by HMRC to be a QROP scheme. On 24 June 2011, HMRC wrote to the Isle of Man Assessor of Income Tax to confirm that schemes approved under 50C were capable of meeting the QROPS criteria set by HMRC, signalling the official end to QROPS review.

In December 2011, HMRC announced a change to QROPS regulations and, following consultation, revised regulations were brought in effective 6 April 2012 by SI 2012/884. The amended regulations introduced a new “benefits exemption test” for overseas schemes whose pensions are not taxed in the overseas country – that if benefits are not subject to tax, then the same tax break has to apply for local residents as it does for non-residents. To quote HMRC, the new test “removes the distortion that makes a scheme more attractive for non-residents than residents from a tax perspective”. Isle of Man 50C schemes do not pass the new test – because 50C pensions are subject to tax in the case of Isle of Man residents – and so 10 Isle of Man schemes fell off the official QROPS list when it was first re-published by HMRC after 6 April 2012. Nonetheless 173 Isle of Man QROPS remain.

The implications however were much larger for Guernsey-based QROPS. Notwithstanding a change in Guernsey pensions legislation in order to attempt to comply with the new QROPS regulations, over 300 Guernsey QROPS were removed from the 12 April 2012 HMRC official list, leaving just 3. The reason for the cull of Guernsey schemes from the QROPS list remains unclear in the absence of any official HMRC statement.

== See also ==
- List of acts of Tynwald § 1970s
