= Television in the Isle of Man =

The Crown dependency of the Isle of Man does not have any television channels of its own but receives United Kingdom television channels.

The Isle of Man does not have an island-specific opt-out of the BBC or ITV regional news programmes, in the way that the Channel Islands get their own version of Spotlight and ITV News Channel TV; instead, the Isle of Man is included as part of BBC North West and ITV Granada.

== United Kingdom television channels available in the Isle of Man ==
=== BBC ===
Television first reached the Isle of Man from the Holme Moss transmitter in Northern England. This transmitter broadcast the BBC TV service on the VHF 405 line system from 12 October 1951. The signal was strong enough to reach a large part of the Isle of Man, especially the east coast which includes the island's capital, Douglas.

In July 1955 the new high-powered Divis transmitter based in Belfast, Northern Ireland came into service, and its signal could easily be received on the west coast of the Isle of Man, bringing the BBC Northern Ireland television service to the island.

BBC TV signals from Sandale transmitter in Cumbria could be received in northern parts of the island since that transmitter started broadcasting in 1956, and signals from the BBC TV Llandonna transmitter in North Wales could be received in southern parts of the island since 1958.

The Isle of Man is covered by BBC North West on BBC One, and receives the local news programme BBC North West Tonight and news bulletins covering the island are included in that programme. The island receives the national England variation of BBC Two. There is no specific island continuity, and the island uses the England-wide continuity for both BBC One and BBC Two. The Isle of Man is part of BBC English Regions. Some viewers receive services from Northern Ireland, Wales and North East & Cumbria rather than from island-based relays.

=== ITV ===
Until 1965, ITV television could be received on the Isle of Man from at least four mainland transmitters in the United Kingdom. Winter Hill transmitter in Lancashire broadcast the Granada Television region to a large part of the island, especially the east coast and the capital Douglas since 1956, Black Mountain transmitter in Belfast could be received on the island's west coast since October 1959 when the Ulster Television region launched in Northern Ireland. The Caldbeck transmitter based in Cumbria which broadcast Border Television could be received in the northern parts of the island from 1961, and the southern parts of the island received ITV transmissions from the Arfon transmitter which broadcast the ITV Wales service from 1962.

It was not until March 1965 that the broadcasting authorities decided to assign a region to the Isle of Man, and thus the creation of relay transmitters on the island itself.

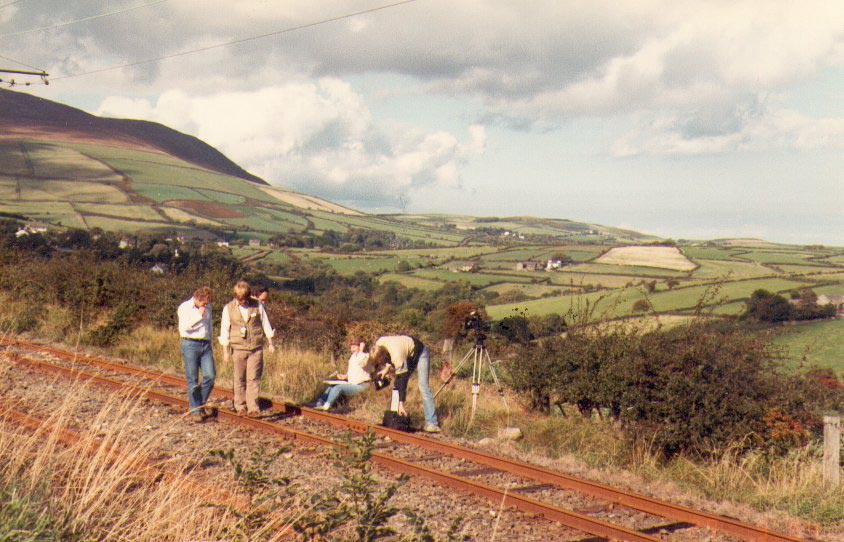
ITV Border film crew at Snaefell Railway on the Isle of Man (August 1984)

Commercial television came to the island on 26 March 1965, unlike the Channel Islands (which were given their own franchise of Channel Television), the Isle of Man was included in the large ITV Border franchise based in Carlisle. After it was announced that the ITV Border and ITV Tyne Tees would merge, a survey was taken of Isle of Man viewers in autumn 2008, and coverage of the island was transferred from ITV Border to ITV Granada on Thursday 16 July 2009. The island receives the national ITV1 continuity, and news from the island is featured in Granada Reports, produced by the island's only reporter, Joshua Stokes. Like the BBC, some viewers receive ITV services through their aerials from elsewhere, including Northern Ireland's UTV and ITV Wales, rather than from local relays.

=== Channel 4 ===
The commercial network Channel 4 broadcasts to the island but Channel 4 does not provide any regionalisation other than advertising. The Isle of Man is covered by Channel 4's North Macro advertising region.

=== Channel 5 ===
The United Kingdom's Channel 5 broadcasts to the island but also utilises a single national channel with regional advertising in which the Isle of Man is covered by The North macro.

=== Digital television ===
The Isle of Man receives the full digital channel service from North West England region. Viewers on the Isle of Man can access the main Freeview transmitters based on the island which transmit the "Freeview Lite" service of just over 20 TV channels and just over 20 radio stations. Depending on location on the island, the full Freeview line-up of channels can be received from Winter Hill transmitter in the Granada region, the Divis transmitter based in Belfast transmitting the UTV region, the Caldbeck transmitter in Cumbria transmitting the Border region and the Arfon transmitter based in North Wales transmitting the ITV Wales service. Signal quality and availability of the full channel line-up from these transmitters varies, depending on the signal coverage available from them on the island.

== Platforms ==
=== Analogue terrestrial ===
Digital switch-over for the Isle of Man was completed on 16 July 2009.

=== Freeview ===
The Isle of Man is included as part of the North West region for Freeview. Alongside Freeview, Youview television service is also available to viewers on the Isle of Man, available from the Freeview transmitters with a broadband internet connection.

=== Satellite Television ===
The paid-for subscription Sky TV service, the free-to-air Freesat from Sky service and the free-to-air Freesat service are fully available on the Isle of Man.

== Television licence ==
The United Kingdom TV licence also covers the Isle of Man which, as of August 2018, is £150.50 and primarily used to fund BBC services. The Isle of Man funds free TV licences for persons 75 and over.

== Local television ==
In 1993, Tynwald passed legislation (the Broadcasting Act 1993) allowing for the establishment of local television services. One application for a licence to run such a service was received by the Communications Commission from Manx Television Limited, a company formed for the purpose of the application. This was rejected in 2003 due to failure to supply relevant supporting evidence. That's Media Group, a community TV provider in the UK announced proposals to establish a dedicated home Isle of Man television service during the 2017 Celtic Media Festival. No details of any intended delivery method were disclosed.

== Online television ==
From May 2012 to December 2020, Manx Telecom TV (MTTV) has operated online by local journalist Paul Moulton providing on-demand news content to a local Isle of Man audience. MTTV was proven to be popular as the Isle of Man does not have a local TV station unlike its counterparts in the Channel Islands. Other presenters on MTTV were Joanne Clague and Mark O'Connor.
