= Opočno (Louny District) =

- Municipality
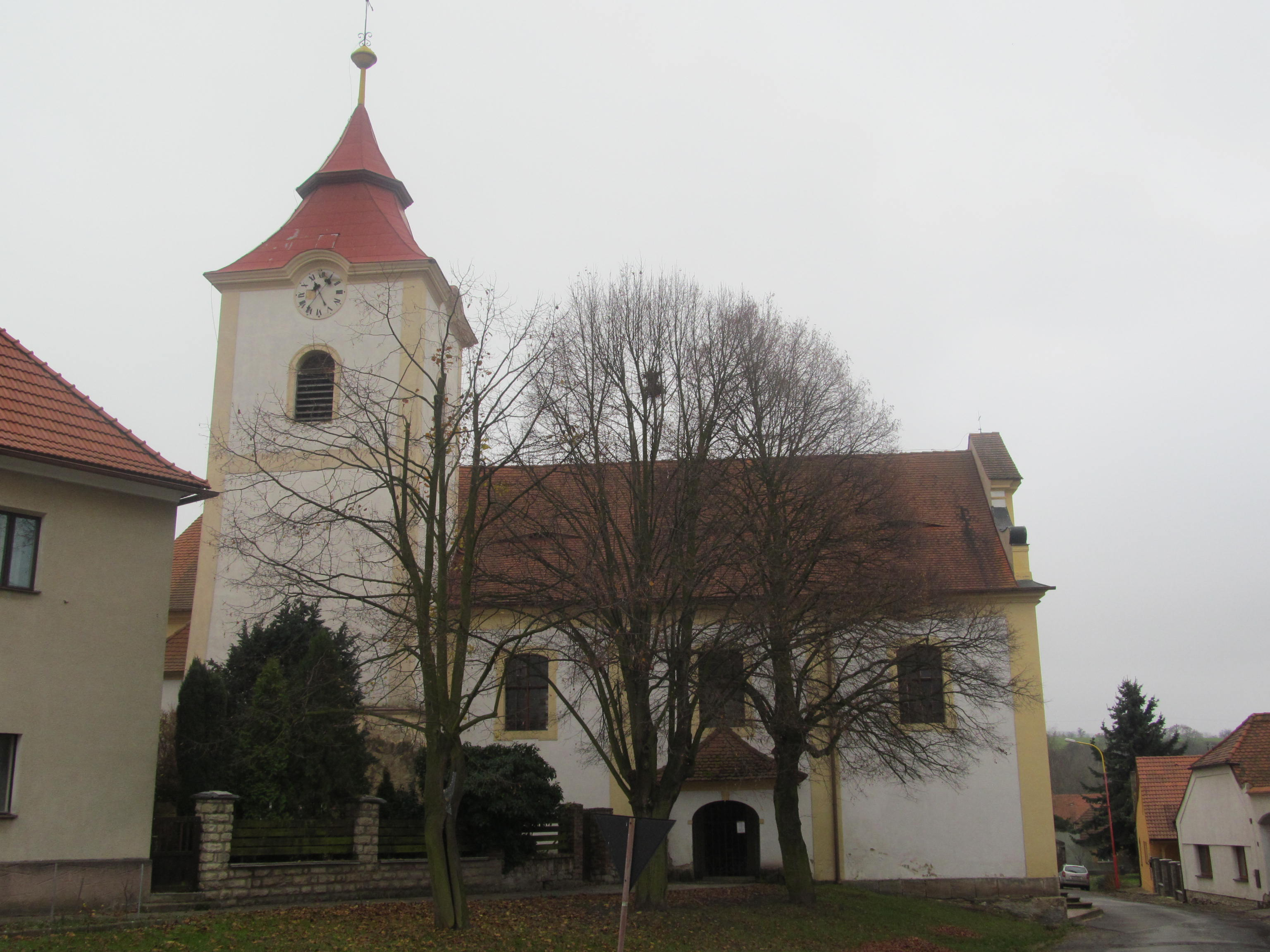
- Church of the Assmuption of the Virgin Mary

- Flag Coat of arms

- Location in the Czech Republic
- Coordinates: 50°18′42″N 13°44′7″E
- Country: Czech Republic
- Region: Ústí nad Labem
- District: Louny
- First mentioned: 1358

Area
  - Total: 2.25 km^{2} (0.87 sq mi)
- Elevation: 252 m (827 ft)

Population (2026-01-01)
  - Total: 117
  - Density: 52.0/km^{2} (135/sq mi)
- Time zone: UTC+1 (CET)
  - Summer (DST): UTC+2 (CEST)
- Postal code: 440 01
- Website: www.obec-opocno.cz

Opočno (German: Opotschna) is a municipality and village in Louny District in the Ústí nad Labem Region of the Czech Republic. It has about 100 inhabitants.

Opočno lies approximately 7 kilometres (4 mi) south-west of Louny, 45 km (28 mi) south-west of Ústí nad Labem, and 55 km (34 mi) north-west of Prague.

== History ==
The first written mention of Opočno is from 1358.

== Demographics ==
Historical population
Year	Pop.	±%
1869	292	—
1880	308	+5.5%
1890	283	−8.1%
1900	290	+2.5%
1910	388	+33.8%
1921	362	−6.7%
1930	329	−9.1%
1950	238	−27.7%
1961	257	+8.0%
1970	202	−21.4%
1980	159	−21.3%
1991	105	−34.0%
2001	119	+13.3%
2011	121	+1.7%
2021	116	−4.1%
Source: Censuses
