= Triskelion =

Symbol with three-fold rotational symmetry

Neolithic triple-spiral scroll motif

A triskelion, or triskeles, is an ancient motif consisting either of a triple spiral exhibiting rotational symmetry or of other patterns in triplicate that emanate from a common center. The spiral design can be based on interlocking Archimedean spirals, or represent three bent human limbs. It occurs in artefacts of the European Neolithic and Bronze Ages with continuation into the Iron Age, especially in the context of the La Tène culture and of related Celtic traditions. The actual triskeles symbol of three human legs is found especially in Greek antiquity, beginning in archaic pottery and continued in coinage of Classical Greece.

In the Hellenistic period, the symbol became associated with the island of Sicily, appearing on coins minted under Dionysius I of Syracuse beginning in c. 382 BCE. It later appears in heraldry, and, other than in the flag of Sicily, came into use in the arms and flags of the Isle of Man (known in the Manx language as ny tree cassyn 'the three legs').

Greek τρισκελής (triskelḗs) means 'three-legged' from τρι- (tri-), 'three times' and σκέλος (skelos), 'leg'. While the Greek adjective τρισκελής 'three-legged' (e.g. of a table) is ancient, use of the term for the symbol is modern, introduced in 1835 by Honoré Théodoric d'Albert de Luynes as French triskèle, and adopted in the spelling triskeles following Otto Olshausen (1886). The form triskelion (as it were Greek τρισκέλιον) is a diminutive which entered English usage in numismatics in the late-19th century. The form consisting of three human legs (as opposed to the triple spiral) has also been called a "triquetra of legs", also triskelos or triskel.

== Use in European antiquity ==
=== Neolithic to Iron Age ===
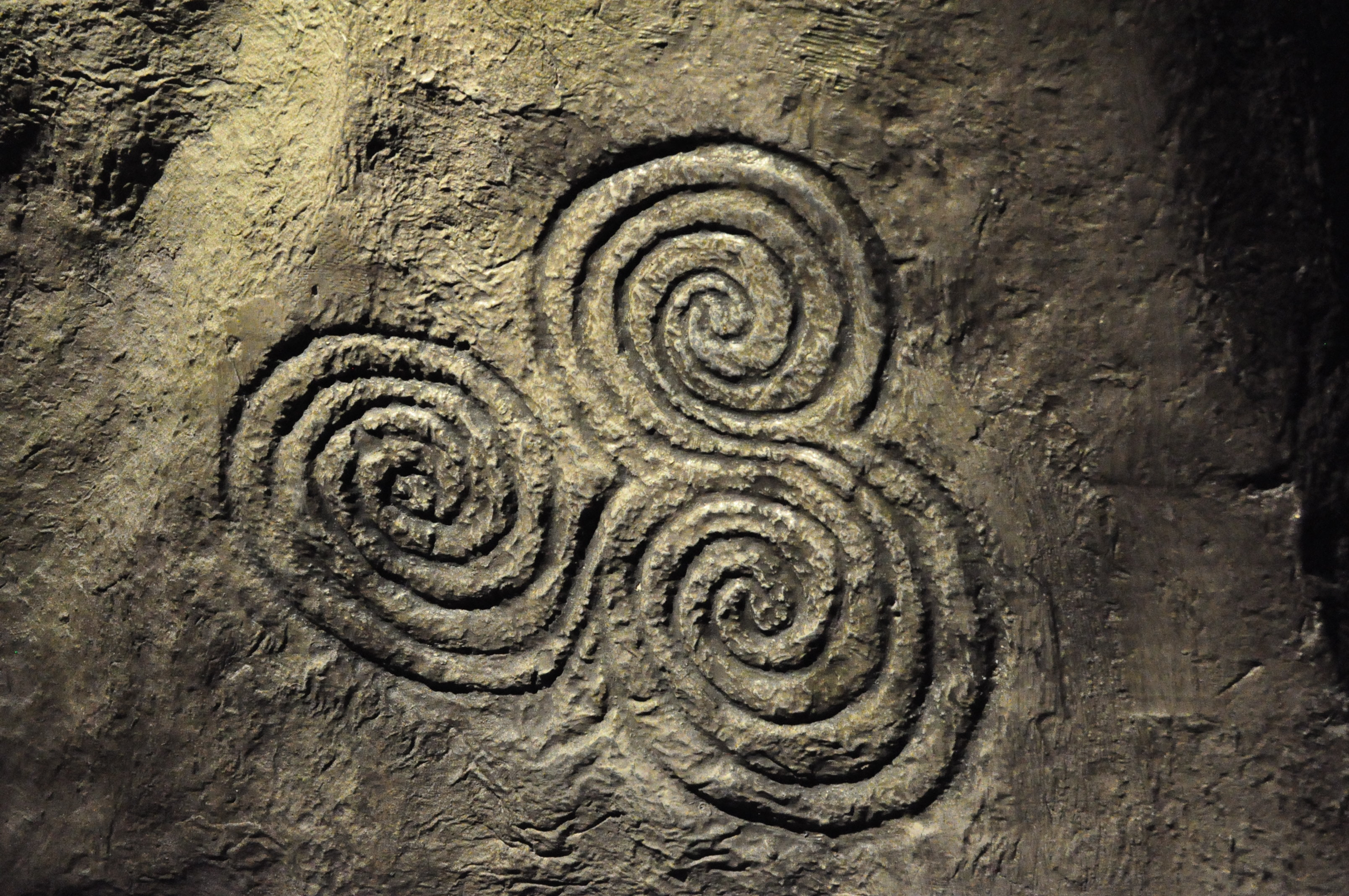
5,000 year-old triskelion on an orthostat at Newgrange

The triple spiral symbol, or three-spiral volute, appears in many early cultures: the first appeared in Malta (4400–3600 BCE); the second in the astronomical calendar of the megalithic tomb of Newgrange in Ireland built around 3200 BCE; as well as on Mycenaean vessels. The Neolithic-era symbol of three conjoined spirals may have had triple significance similar to the imagery that lies behind the triskelion. It is carved into the rock of a stone lozenge near the main entrance of the prehistoric Newgrange monument in what is now County Meath, Ireland. It also appears on a 1st-century BCE dolmen tomb in Rathkenny in County Meath.

There is also an example of a triskele on a stone fragment discovered in Gloucestershire, England, that, as of 2023, is held by the British Museum and thought to date from between the Neolithic period and the Bronze Age.

The triskelion was a motif in the art of the Iron Age Celtic La Tène culture.

=== Classical Antiquity ===
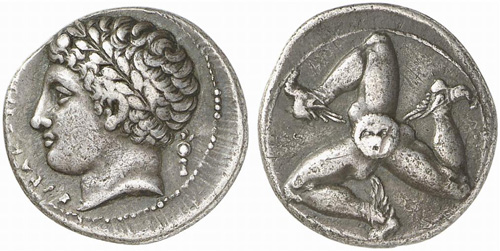
Silver Drachma from Sicily, minted during the reign of Agathocles (361–289 BCE), Greek tyrant of Syracuse (317–289 BCE) and king of Sicily (304–289 BCE). Inscription: ΣΥΡΑΚΟΣΙΩΝ (Syrakosion) Laureate head of the youthful Ares to left; behind, Palladion. Reverse: Triskeles of three human legs with winged feet; at the center, Gorgoneion

The triskeles proper, composed of three human legs, is younger than the triple spiral found in decorations on Greek pottery, especially as a design shown on Hoplite shields and later Greek and Anatolian coinage. An early example is found on the Shield of Achilles in an Attic hydria of the late-6th century BCE. It is found on coinage in Lycia and on staters of Pamphylia (at Aspendos in 370–333 BCE) and Pisidia. The meaning of the Greek triskeles is not recorded directly. The Duke of Luynes, in his 1835 study, noted the co-occurrence of the symbol with the eagle, the cockerel, the head of Medusa, Perseus, three crescent moons, three ears of corn, and three grains of corn. From this, he reconstructed a feminine divine triad that he identified with the triple goddess Hecate.

The triskeles was adopted as emblem by the rulers of Syracuse. It is possible that this usage is related with the Greek name of the island of Sicily, Τρινακρία (Trinacria) 'having three headlands'. The Sicilian triskeles is shown with the head of Medusa at the center. The ancient symbol has been re-introduced in modern flags of Sicily since 1848. The oldest find of a triskeles in Sicily is a vase dated to the late-7th century BCE of which researchers speculated a Minoan-Mycenaean origin (and for which no proof has been given).

=== Roman period and Late Antiquity ===
Late examples of the triple spiral symbols are found in Iron Age Europe, carved in rock in Castro Culture settlements in Galicia, Asturias, and Northern Portugal. The symbol took on new meaning to Irish Celtic Christians before the 5th century CE as a symbol of the Trinity.

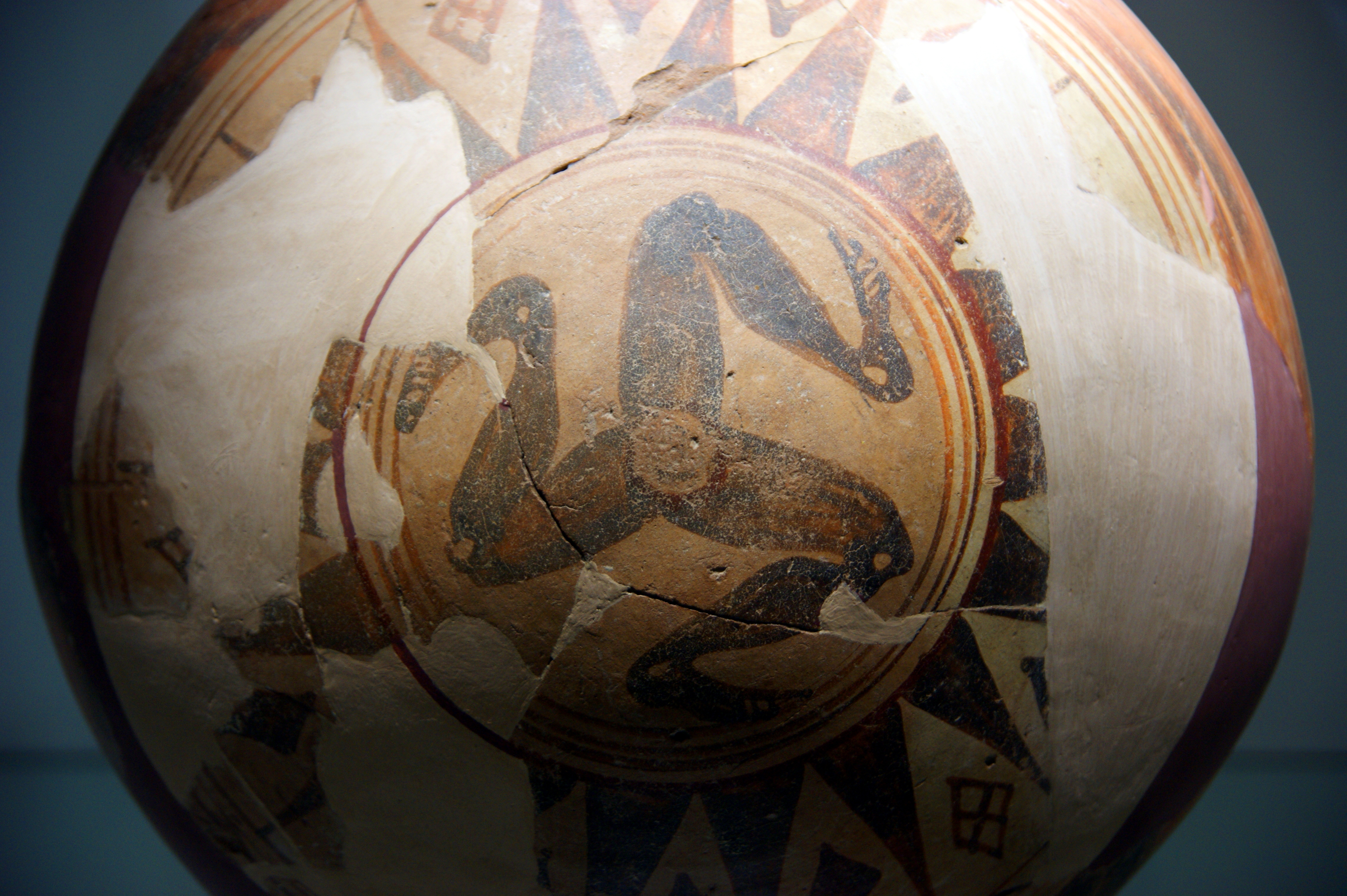
Triskelion of Sicily on vase of the late 7th century BCE

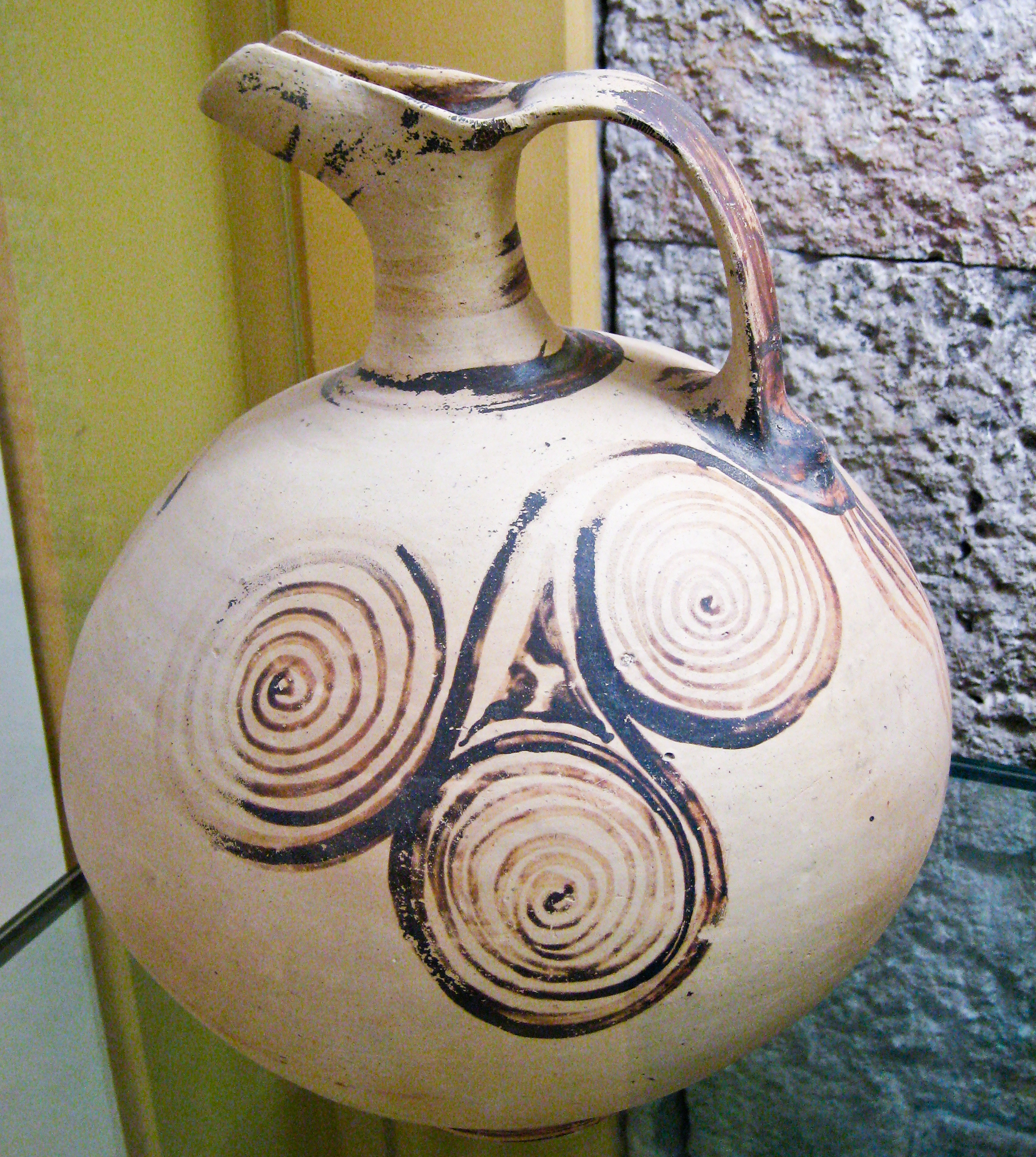
Late Helladic (14th century BCE) beaked jug decorated with triple spirals

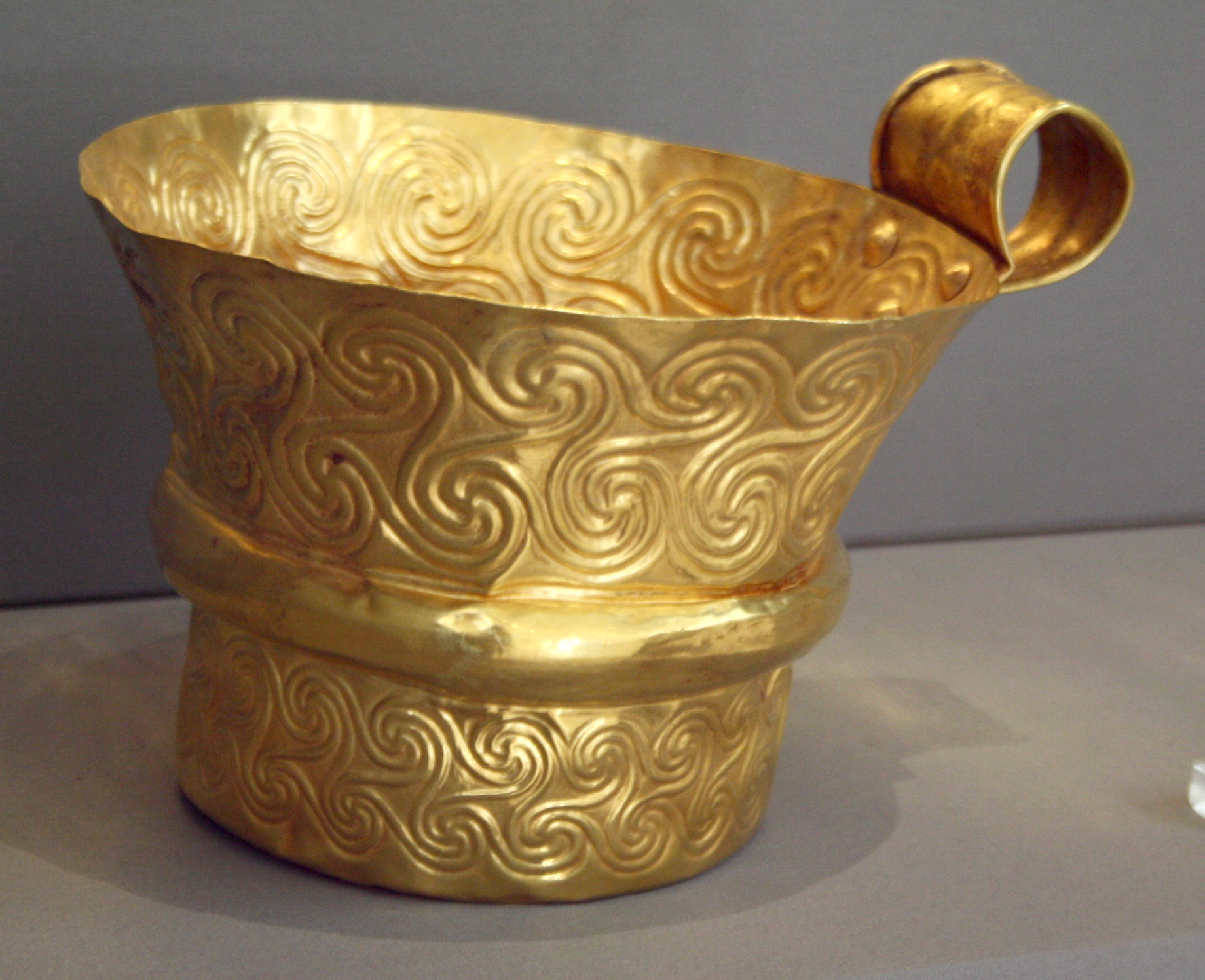
Gold cup from Mycenae decorated with triskelions

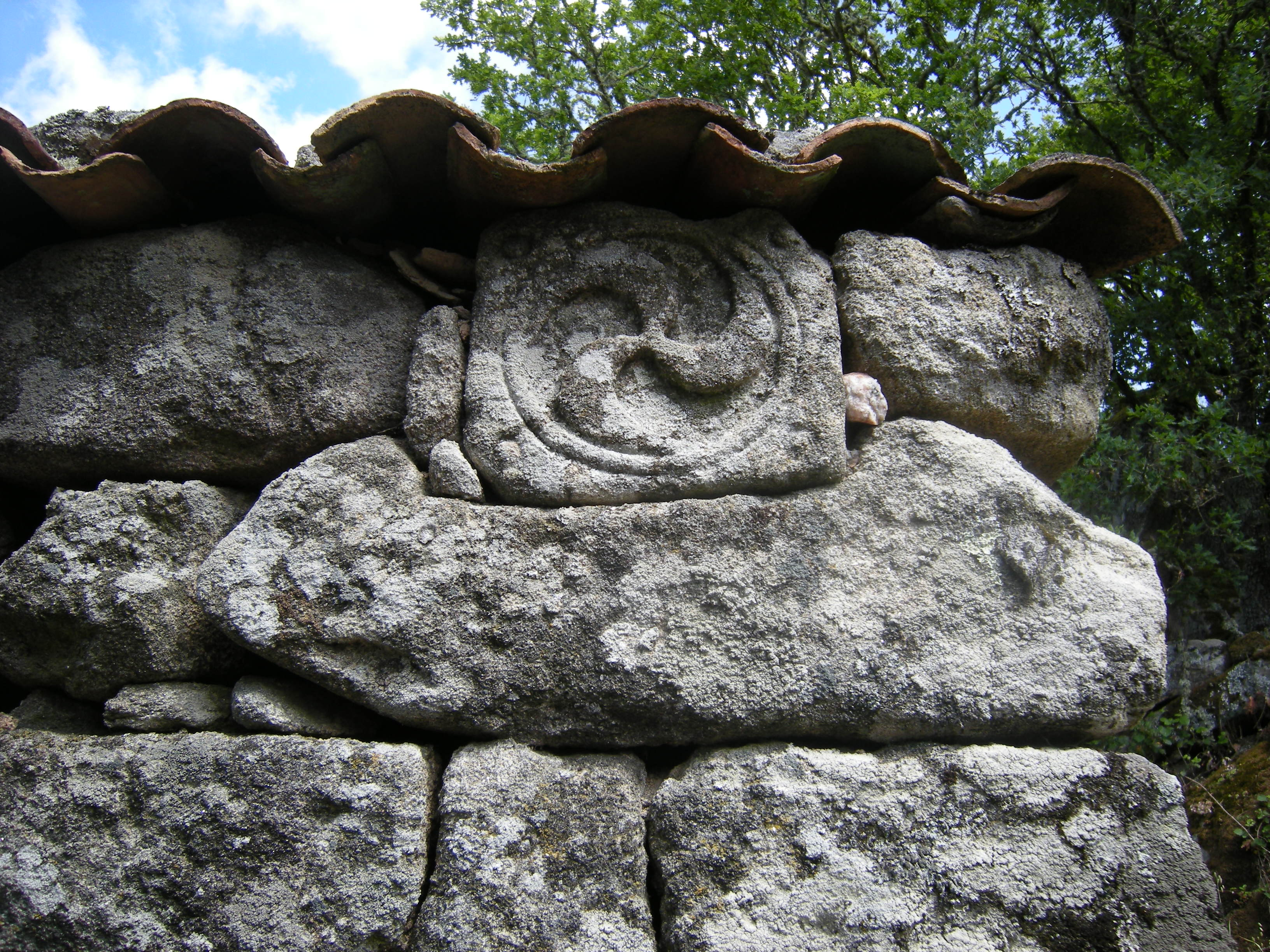
Iron Age Castro culture triskele, reused in a barn, Airavella, Allariz, Galicia, Spain

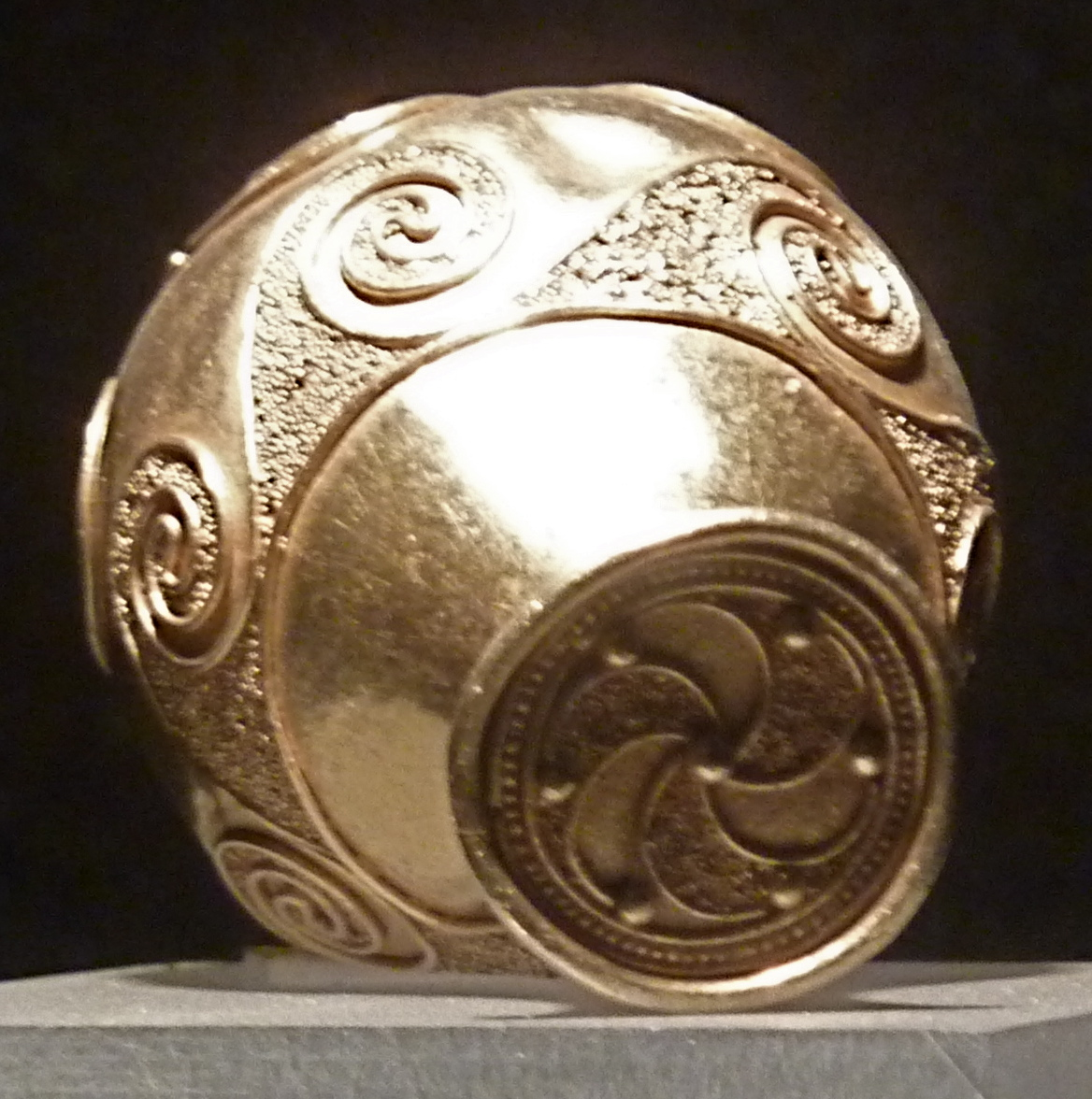
Triskelion and spirals on a Galician torc terminal

== Medieval use ==
The triple spiral design is found as a decorative element in Gothic architecture. The three legs (triskeles) symbol is rarely found as a charge in late medieval heraldry, notably as the arms of the King of Mann (Armorial Wijnbergen, c. 1280), and as canting arms in the city seal of the Bavarian city of Füssen (dated 1317).

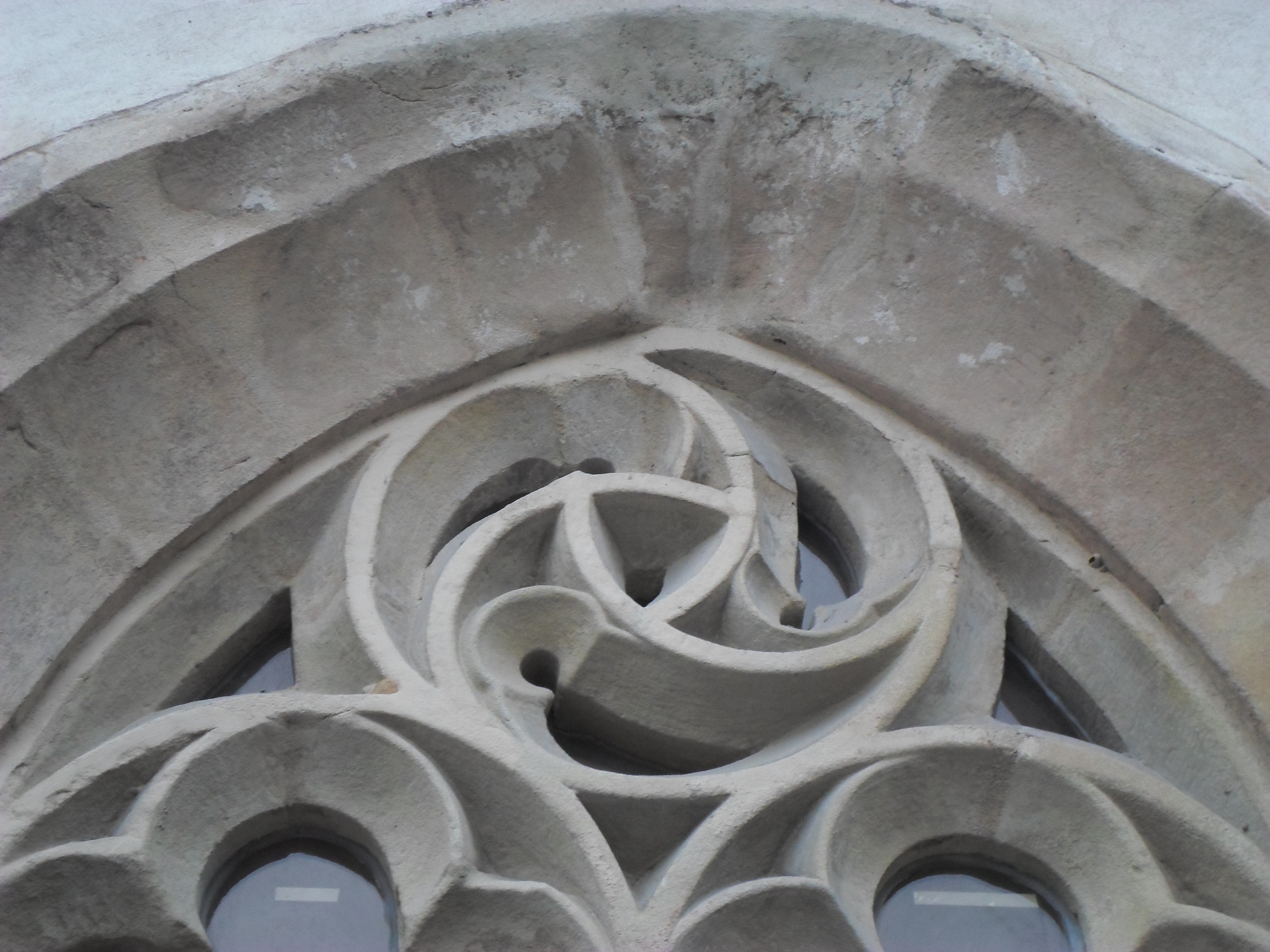
Triskèle Saint-Marcellin (in Isère / France)

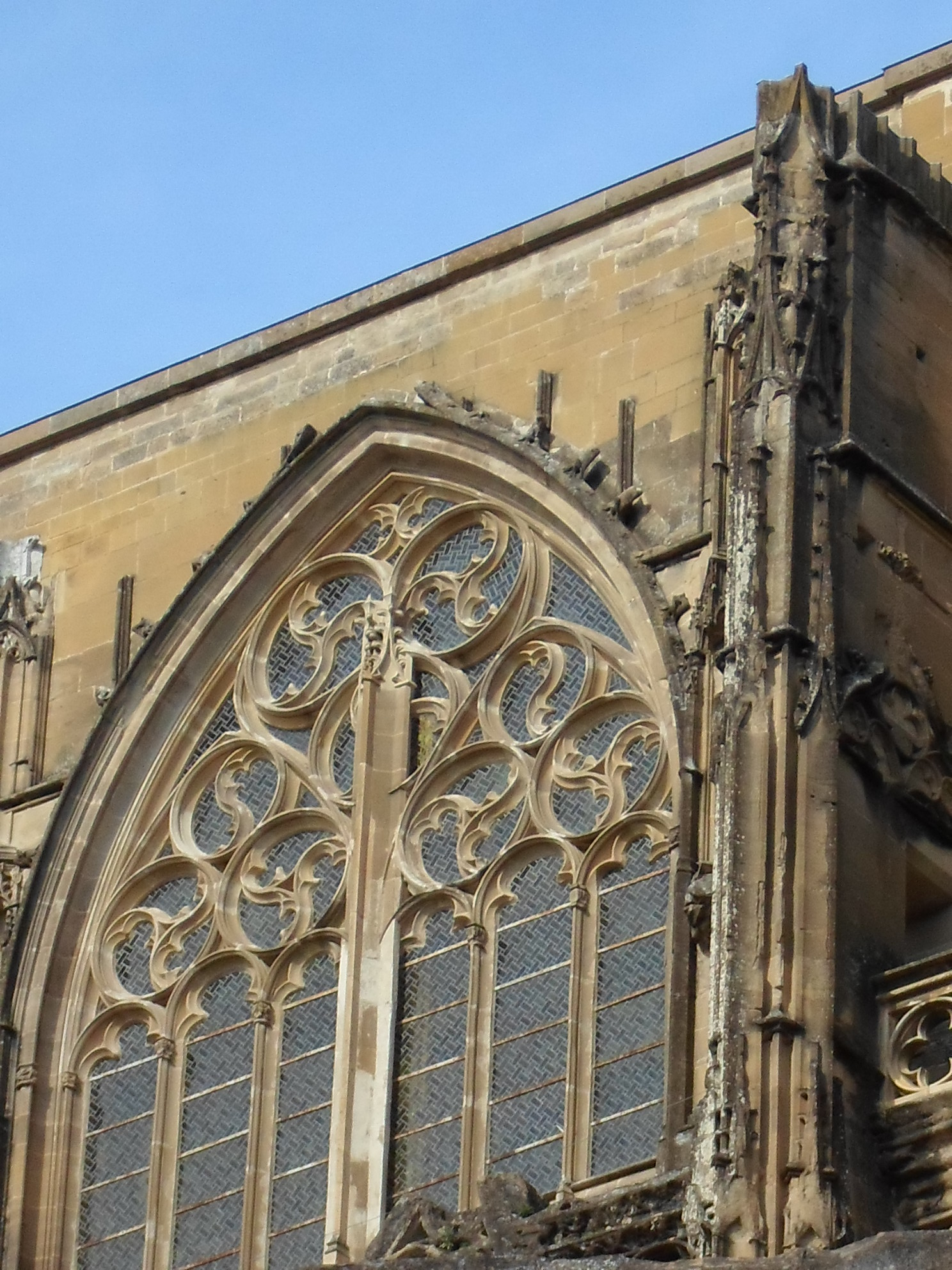
On the front of Abbatial church of Saint-Antoine-l'Abbaye with 2 groups of 2 triskelions and 1 biskel (in Isère / France)

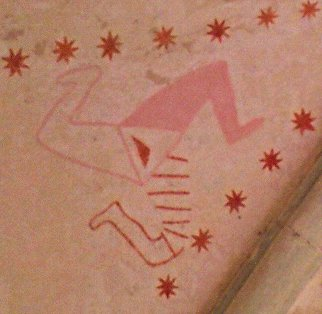
Mural depicting a triskelion on the ceiling of Karja church in Saaremaa, Estonia

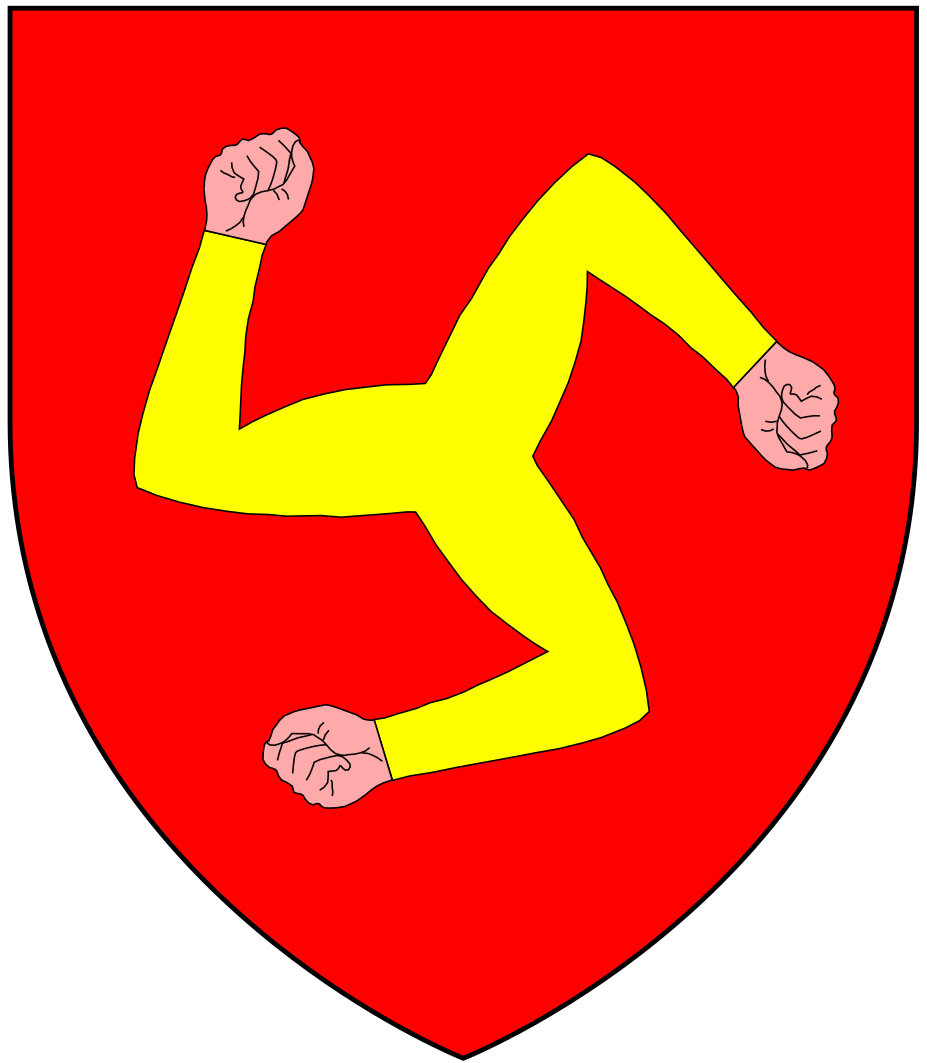
Tremayne family triskelion arms

== Modern usage ==
The town of Dukla in Poland has used three hunting bugles arranged in triskelion shape as its symbol since the 16th century.

The triskeles was included in the design of the Army Gold Medal awarded to British Army majors and above who had taken a key part in the Battle of Maida (1806). An early flag of Sicily, proposed in 1848, included the Sicilian triskeles or "Trinacria symbol". Later versions of Sicilian flags have retained the emblem, including the one officially adopted in 2000. The flag of the Isle of Man (1932) shows a heraldic design of a triskeles of three armoured legs.

The flag and coat of arms of the Bavarian town of Füssen, Germany, contain a triskele, as does the flag of the Russian autonomous region of Ust-Orda Buryat Okrug.

In the Republic of Ireland the triskelion is displayed in hospitals and care centres to indicate that a patient is dying or has died. It is based on the historical use of the triskele in Celtic Ireland and it is used as an alternative to religious imagery. In this context, the three spirals represent the cycle of birth, life and death.

The spiral is used by some polytheistic reconstructionist or neopagan groups. As a "Celtic symbol", it is used primarily by groups with a Celtic cultural orientation and, less frequently, can also be found in use by various eclectic or syncretic traditions such as Neopaganism. The spiral triskele is one of the primary symbols of Celtic Reconstructionist Paganism, used to represent a variety of triplicities in cosmology and theology; it is also a favoured symbol due to its association with Manannán mac Lir, a sea god within Irish mythology.

Other uses of triskelion-like emblems include the logo for the Trisquel Linux distribution and the seal of the United States Department of Transportation.

In the 1960s television programme Star Trek: The Original Series, members of the crew are forced to fight to the death on a triskelion playing surface in the episode "The Gamesters of Triskelion".

A specific version of the triskele comprising three sevens has been adopted by neo-Nazis. In South Africa the Afrikaner Weerstandsbeweging (AWB), an Afrikaner nationalist, neo-Nazi organisation and political party (founded 1973), uses it as its symbol in place of a swastika. The Blood & Honour neo-Nazi group also uses it. The 27th SS Volunteer Division Langemarck's shoulder strap cipher was a triskele (though not involving sevens). Use of the triskele can be a prosecutable offence under German law, depending on the context in which it is used.

A common symbol in the BDSM community is a derivation of a triskelion shape within a circle. Its BDSM usage derives from the Ring of O in the book Story of O. The BDSM Emblem Project claims copyright over one particular specified form of the triskelion symbol; other variants of the triskelion are free from such copyright claims.

Coat of arms of Dukla

Flag of the Isle of Man

Flag of Sicily, with the triskeles-and-Gorgoneion symbol

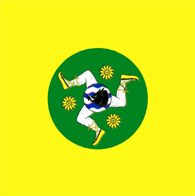
Flag of Sărata-Galbenă

Flag of Ust-Orda Buryat Okrug

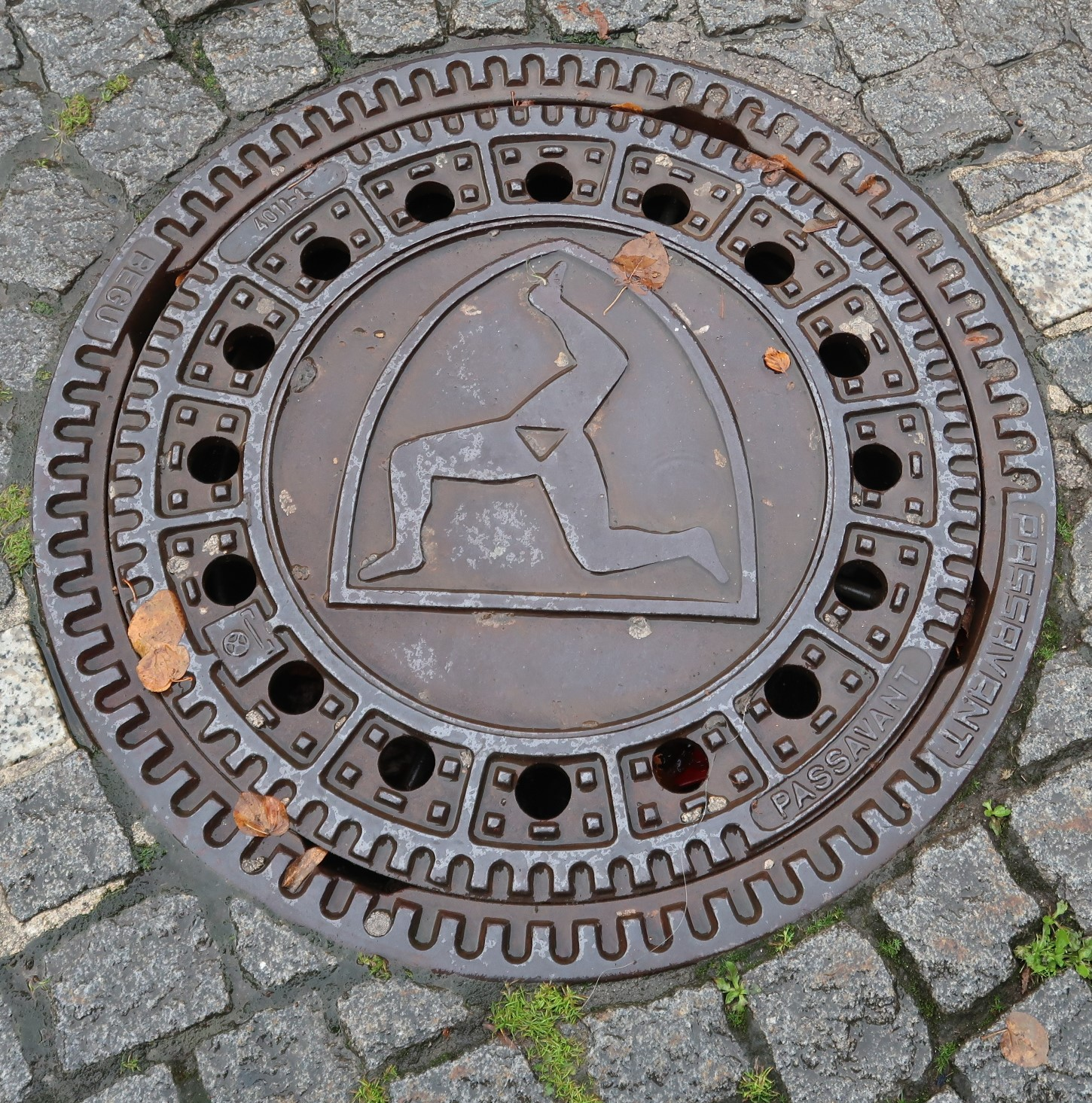
Füssen manhole cover showing coat of arms

Flag of Ingushetia

Emblem of the 27th SS Volunteer Division Langemarck

flag of the Breton National Party

Flag of Afrikaner Weerstandsbeweging

Logo of Trisquel GNU/Linux

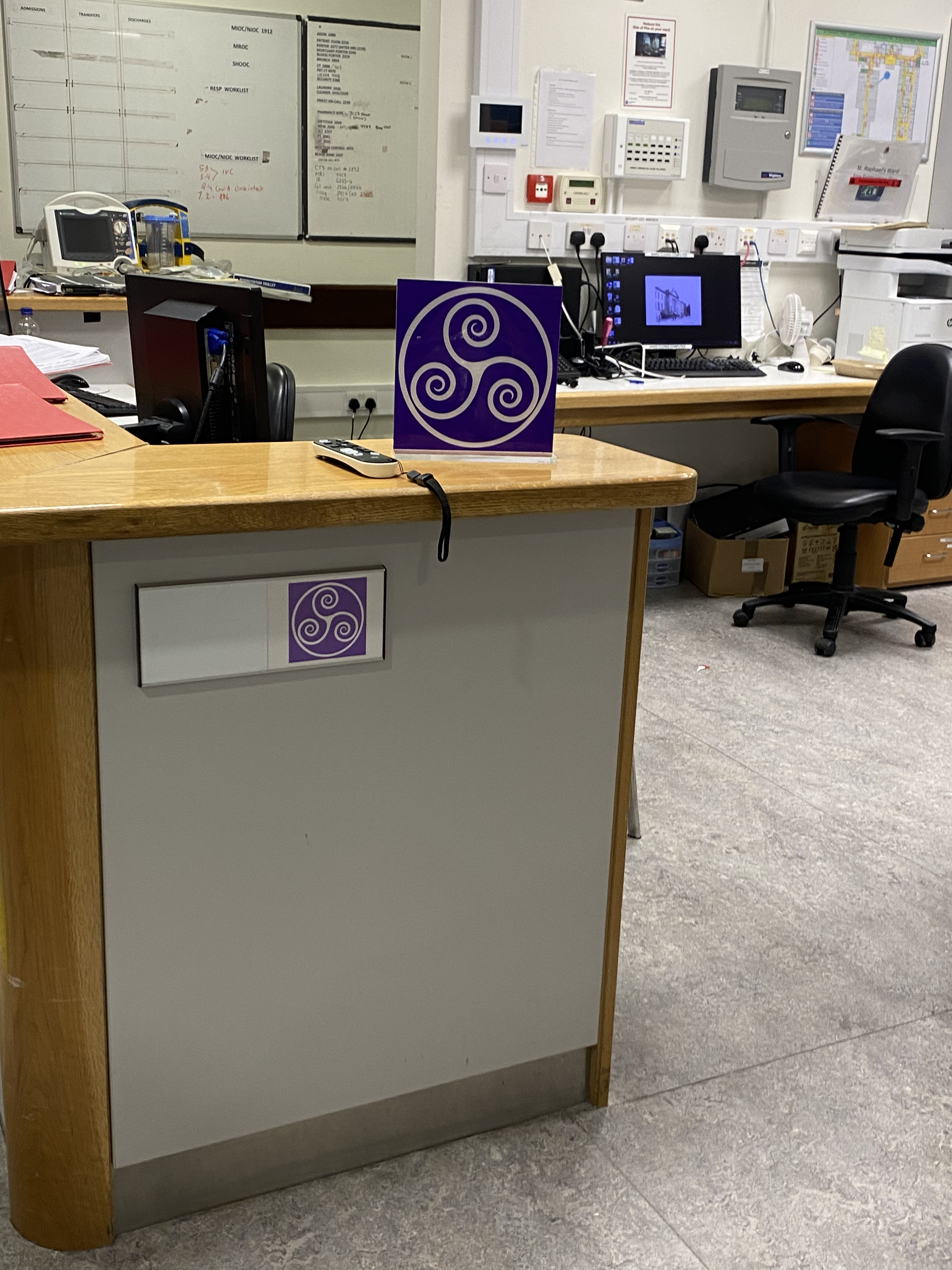
The triskelion is used as an end-of-life symbol in the Irish healthcare system.

Seal of the US Department of Transportation

Flag of the Asturian Nationalist Council

Coat of arms of Opočno (Louny District)

The BDSM rights flag with triskelion-type emblem (not copyrighted)

== Occurrence in nature ==
The boric acid and triethylborane molecules are triskelion-shaped as seen in the images. The molecular point group of triskelion-shaped molecules is C_{3h}. The endocytic protein, clathrin, is triskelion-shaped, as well as the Ediacaran organism Tribrachidium.

A molecule of triethylborane

A molecule of boric acid

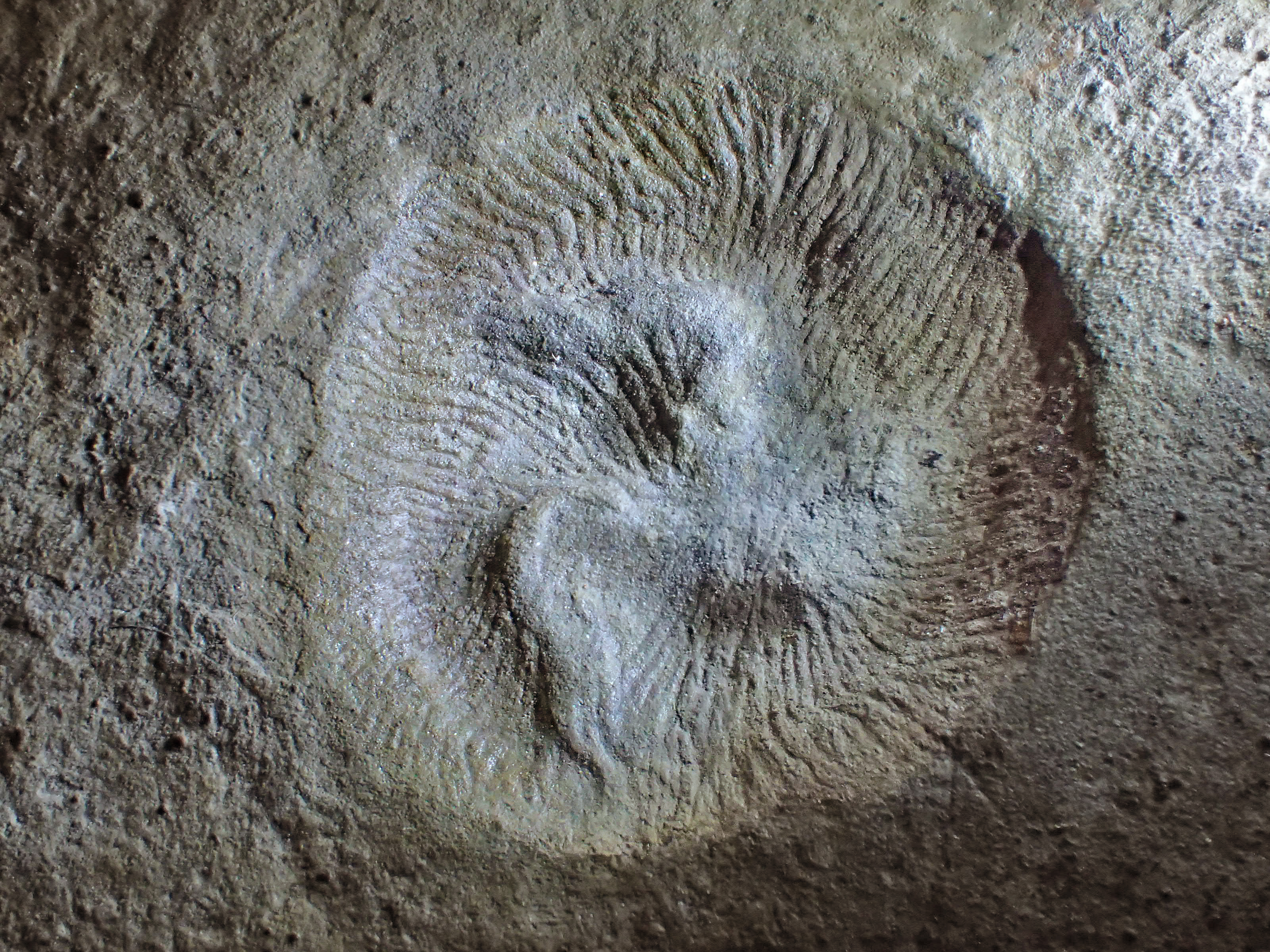
The Ediacaran organism Tribrachidium

== See also ==
- Buer (demon)
- Caltrop
- Lauburu
- Three hares
- Three-legged crow
- Tomoe
- Triquetra
