= Clerk of Tynwald =

The Clerk of Tynwald is the chief administrator of the Court of Tynwald in the Isle of Man. He also serves as secretary to the House of Keys and counsel to the Speaker. He assists the president in managing the business of the House of Keys, keeps records of proceedings, and advises members on bills. He provides legal and parliamentary advice to all members and is therefore always a qualified lawyer.

The current Clerk of Tynwald is Jonathan King LLB, who was previously a Deputy Clerk of Tynwald.

== List of Clerks of Tynwald ==
- Professor St. John Bates, 1987–2001
- Malachy Cornwell-Kelly LLB AKC MCMI, 2001–2008
- Roger Phillips LLB, 2008–2021.
- Jonathan King LLB, 2021–Present
