= Flag of the Isle of Man =

Isle of Man
- Use: Civil and state flag
- Proportion: 1:2
- Adopted: 1 December 1932; 93 years ago
- Design: A triskelion made up of three armoured legs with golden spurs, in the centre of a red field.

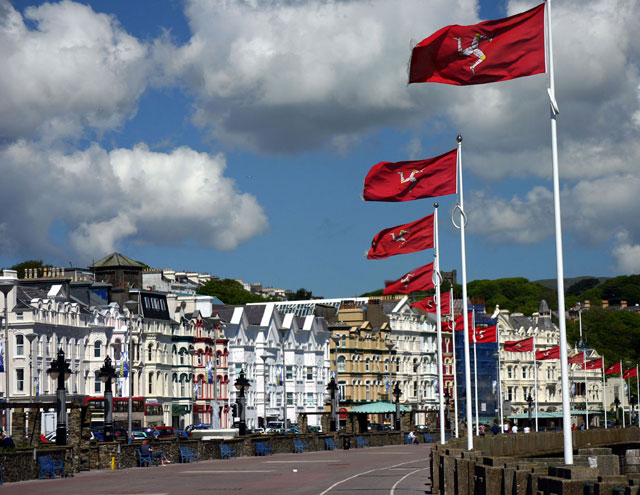
Manx flags on the Loch Promenade, Douglas

The flag of the Isle of Man (Manx: brattagh Vannin) is a triskelion, composed of three armoured legs with golden spurs, upon a red background. It has been the official flag of the Isle of Man since 1 December 1932 and is based on the Manx coat of arms, which dates back to the 13th century.

The three legs are known in Manx as ny tree cassyn 'the three legs'. The triskelion is an ancient symbol, used by the Mycenaeans and the Lycians.

== History ==
=== Crovan dynasty ===
Until 1265, the Isle of Man formed part of the Kingdom of the Isles, ruled by the Crovan dynasty. The last member of that ruling family died in 1265 without a legitimate heir, when the Isle passed into the possession of Alexander III, King of Scotland (d.1286). In 1266 sovereignty of the Isle of Man and the Hebrides was formally transferred from the King of Norway to King Alexander III of Scotland (1241–1286). The heraldic era in England and Scotland started in about 1215, slightly earlier in Western Europe, and members of the Crovan dynasty are known to have borne ships and lions on their seals, and no evidence exists of their use of the triskeles. It is possible that the origin of the Manx triskeles is a knotted device depicted on the coinage of their 10th-century Viking predecessors on the Isle. However, that device is dissimilar to the Manx triskeles, and the nearly 300-year gap between its use and the appearance of the Manx triskeles suggests that there is no connection between the symbols.

=== Possible Sicilian connection ===
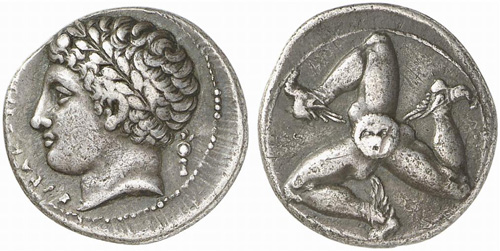
Silver Drachma from Sicily, minted during the reign of Agathocles (361–289 BC), Greek tyrant of Syracuse (317–289 BC) and king of Sicily (304–289 BC). Inscription: ΣΥΡΑΚΟΣΙΩΝ ('Syrakosion'). Laureate head of the youthful Ares to left; behind, Palladion. Reverse: triskeles of three human legs with winged feet; at the center, Gorgoneion.

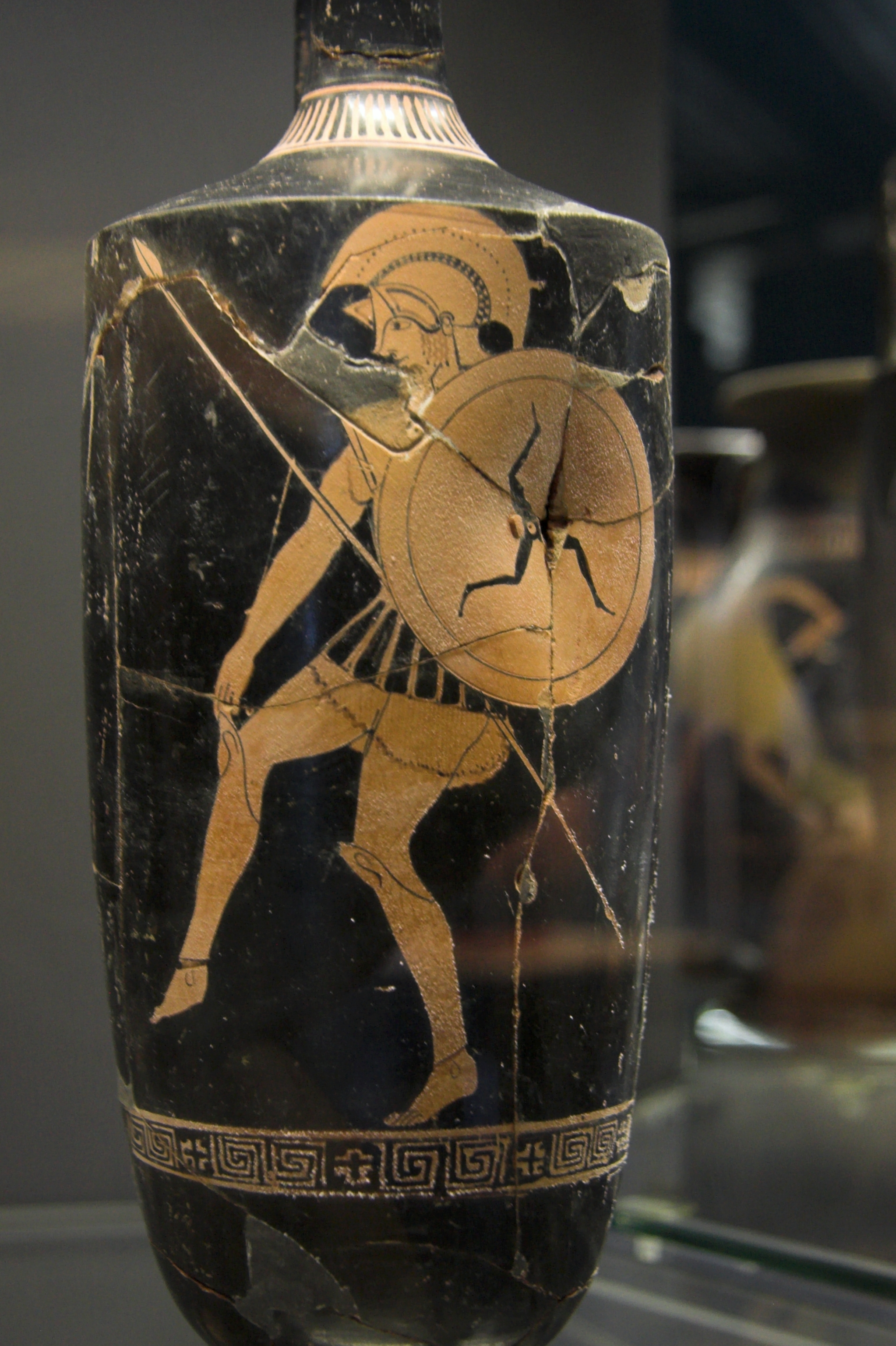
Three-legged symbol of Sicily depicted as a proto-heraldic device on the shield of a Greek warrior. Greek Red Figure lekythos vase, c. 470 BC, found in a tomb near Licata, Sicily. Archaeological Museum of Syracuse, Sicily

The appearance on the Isle of Man of the triskeles in the last third of the 13th century may well be connected with the regime change on the isle in 1265, from Crovan to Scots kings. The symbol is anciently closely associated with Sicily, well known as a tri-cornered island, and is attested there in proto-heraldry as early as the 7th century BC. The most ancient name of Sicily, then a Greek province, was Trinacria, meaning in Greek 'three-cornered', triquetra, referring to the triangular shape of the island.

In 1250, the Germanic Frederick II, Holy Roman Emperor, died after having ruled Sicily for 52 years. He was King of Sicily from 1198, King of Germany from 1212, King of Italy and Holy Roman Emperor from 1220, and King of Jerusalem from 1225. His mother was Constance, Queen of Sicily and his father was Emperor Henry VI of the House of Hohenstaufen. Although there is no evidence that the triskeles was used in Sicily in the 13th century, there is architectural evidence of its use in Austria at that time, almost certainly relating to a personal emblem of Frederick, and almost certainly stemming from his Sicilian connection.

Four years after Frederick's death, the pope invested the Sicilian kingship in Edmund Crouchback (died 1296), the second surviving son of King Henry III of England (died 1272), and for about ten years afterwards Edmund was styled King of Sicily. Henry invested considerable political capital in his son's new position, and in his efforts to raise funds from taxation to support the dignity of that kingship made himself extremely unpopular with his English nobles, who eventually rebelled.

The wife of Alexander III of Scotland was Margaret of England (died 1275), a daughter of Henry III. This familial connection between the English and Scottish royal families might account for the introduction of the triskeles as a symbol of the Isle of Man. If so, it may well have been adopted as a means to reinforce the regime change on the island.

Following English domination of the isle in 1346, the triskelion was retained and has endured as a symbol of the Isle of Man.

By the mid-19th century, the Manx flag began appearing on merchant ships from the Isle of Man. However, such usage of the flag was not sanctioned by the Board of Trade and the Admiralty under Section 105 of the 1854 Merchant Shipping Act in favour of the Red Ensign. This decision was reversed by the Admiralty on 4 March 1889 and Manx merchant ships were permitted to fly the Flag of the Isle of Man.

The flag was officially adopted between 1928 and 1932; however, sources differ on the exact date.

In July 1968, steps were taken to standardise the flag. The feet of the triskelion were all to be facing in a clockwise direction and the design was to be balanced with one leg directly planted at the bottom. On 27 August 1971, a civil ensign for the Isle of Man was approved by royal proclamation. This flag featured a red field with the Union Jack in the canton. The triskelion of Man is emblazoned off centre towards the fly. Another Manx flag in use is the flag of Tynwald, the legislature of the Isle of Man, which has flown outside the Legislative Buildings since 1971.

== Other flags ==
Certain parishes on the Isle of Man have flags, namely Onchan, Maughold, Douglas and Malew.

== Gallery ==
Standard of the Lieutenant Governor

Flag of Tynwald

Civil Ensign of the Isle of Man

Flag of the Civil Defence Corps

Manx Australian heritage flag

House Flag of Isle of Man Steam Packet Company

IMSPC old fleet commodore’s flag

== See also ==
- Coat of arms of the Isle of Man
- Flag of Sicily, a similar flag with a triskelion
