= Chief Executive (Isle of Man Government) =

The chief executive of the Isle of Man Government is the head of the Isle of Man Civil Service. As of September 2025, the chief executive is Mark Lewin.

The chief executive provides advice and guidance to the Chief Minister and the Council of Ministers, as well as the Lieutenant Governor.

Previously the post was titled as Chief Secretary (Manx: Ard-scrudeyr) and the Government Secretary.

== List of Chief Executives ==
- Caldric Randall, 2023
- Andy Ralphs, 2023–2025
- Mark Lewin, 2025–present

== List of Chief Secretaries ==
- Peter Hulme, 1979–1989
- Fred Kissack, 1989–2002
- Mary Williams, 2002–2011
- Will Greenhow, 2011–2022
- Caldric Randall, 2022–2023
