= Coat of arms of the Isle of Man =

National coat of arms

The Arms of His Majesty in right of the Isle of Man
- Armiger: King Charles III, Lord of Mann
- Adopted: 12 July 1996
- Crest: An imperial crown proper
- Shield: Gules three legs in armour flexed at the knee and conjoined at the thigh, all proper, garnished and spurred or.
- Supporters: Dexter a peregrine falcon and sinister a raven both proper
- Motto: Quocunque Jeceris Stabit

The coat of arms of the Isle of Man, blazoned Gules three legs in armour flexed at the knee and conjoined at the thigh, all proper, garnished and spurred or, dates from the late 13th century. The present version dates from 12 July 1996. As the Isle of Man is a Crown dependency and the present Lord of Man is King Charles III of the United Kingdom, the arms are more accurately described as the arms of His Majesty in right of the Isle of Man. The origin of the triskeles (three dexter legs conjoined at the hips and flexed in triangle) is obscure, but it appears to stem from the Scottish takeover of the island in 1265. The heraldic supporters are birds associated with the island, whilst the motto first appears on record in the 17th century.

== Description ==
The present coat of arms was granted by Queen Elizabeth II, Lord of Mann, on 12 July 1996. The escutcheon is blazoned: Gules three legs in armour flexed at the knee and conjoined at the thigh, all proper, garnished and spurred or. The crest is blazoned: An imperial crown proper. The supporters are blazoned: dexter: A peregrine falcon proper and sinister: A raven proper. The Latin motto is: Quocunque Jeceris Stabit ("whithersoever you throw it, it will stand", or "whichever way you throw, it will stand". This refers to the theoretical aerodynamical properties of the triskele, which will supposedly always have a foot to land on whichever way it lands. The motto dates to 1668 when it is first recorded on coinage of the Isle of Man.

== Origin ==
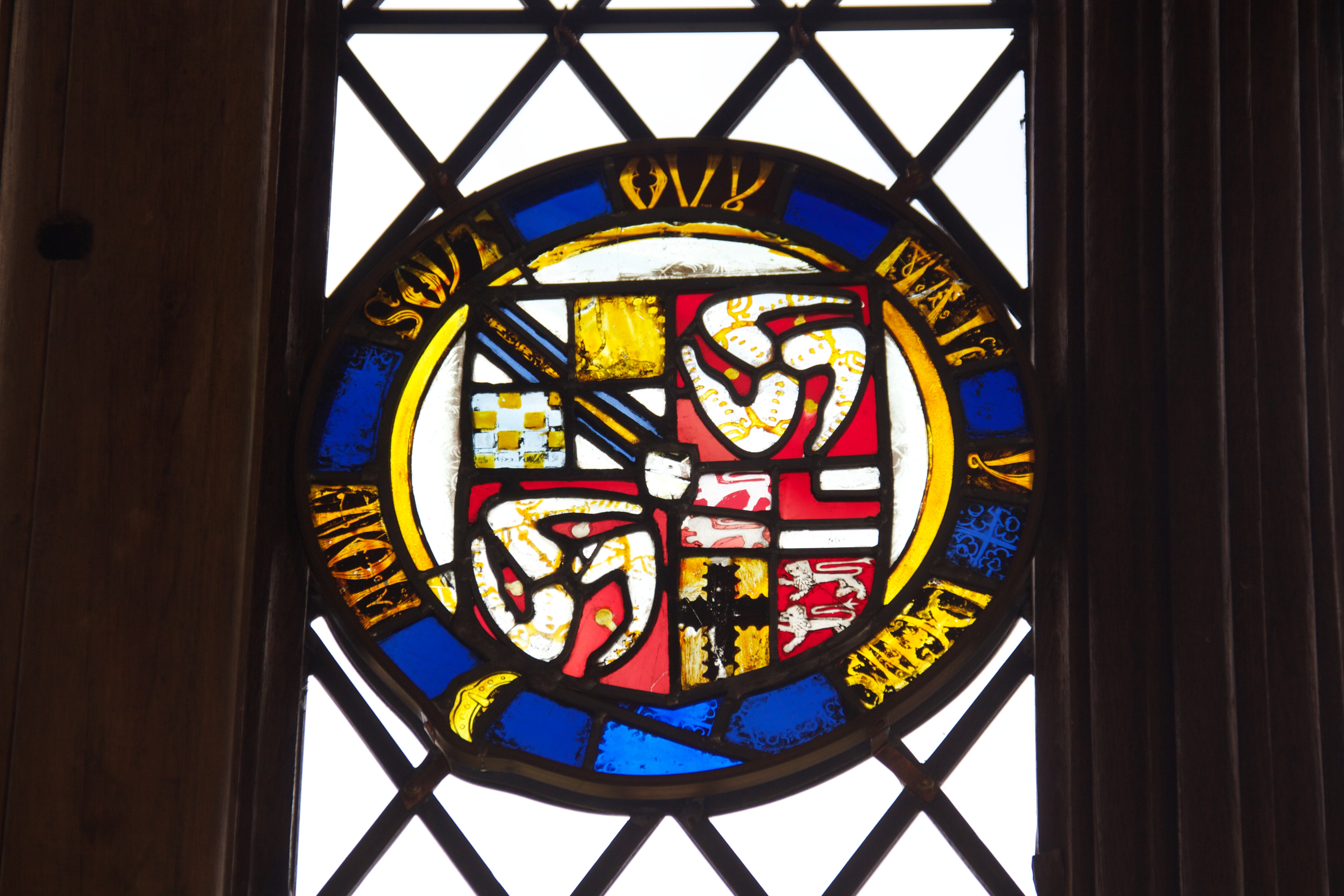
Ordsall Hall, Salford, 15th c. stained glass. Arms of Stanley, four grand quarters: 1:Stanley; 2 & 3: King of Man; 4: Strange of Knockyn, all circumscribed by the Garter. Possibly the arms of Thomas, 1st Earl of Derby (1435–1504), KG

The heraldic device of the triskele or triskeles has been associated with the Isle of Man for centuries. In 1405, King Henry IV of England granted the Isle of Man to John Stanley (c. 1350–1414), KG (whose eventual successor in 1485 was created Earl of Derby for his services to Henry VII at the Battle of Bosworth), for the feudal tenure of grand serjeanty, namely of providing to him a pair of peregrine falcons, also to be provided to every future English king on his coronation. This formal bestowal of a pair of falcons continued until the coronation of George IV in 1822. The Stanley family, Earls of Derby, still display the arms of Man today, quartered by their paternal arms. As does the Murray family, Dukes of Atholl, which quarters Stanley. The raven is a bird strongly associated with Norse mythology, and appears in numerous place names on the island.

== Rolls of arms ==
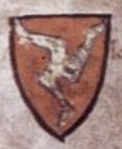
Coat of arms of the King of Man depicted on the Wijnbergen Roll of Arms (c.1270-1300)

The present coat of arms is an augmentation of honour of the ancient arms of the feudal Lord of Man. It is unknown when the triskeles device was originally adopted as a symbol relating to the Isle of Man. It appears associated with the Isle in several late 13th-century rolls of arms, such as the Camden Roll, Herald's Roll, Segar's Roll, Walford's Roll, and Wijnbergen Roll, all of which date from 1270 to 1300. The coat of arms in Camden Roll is blazoned: L'escu de gules, a(vec) treis jambes armez ("'The shield gules with three legs in armour"). The coat of arms depicted in Walford's Roll is blazoned in Norman-French: De goules a(vec) treys gambes armes o(vec) tucte le guisses et chekun cornere seyt une pee. (in modern French: De gules avec trois jambes armées avec tous les cuisses et chaque un coin soit unie – "Of gules with three legs in armour with all the thighs and each corner united"). The coat of arms in the Wijnbergen Roll is blazoned (translated): Gules, three mailed legs embowed and conjoined at the thighs argent spurred or. Another early example of the coat of arms is preserved in the late 14th century Armorial de Gelre.

== History ==
=== Crovan dynasty ===
Until 1265 the Isle of Man formed part of the Kingdom of the Isles, ruled by the Crovan dynasty. The last member of that ruling family died in 1265 without a legitimate heir, and the Isle passed into the possession of Alexander III, King of Scotland (d.1286). In 1266 sovereignty of the Isle of Man and the Hebrides was formally transferred from the King of Norway to King Alexander III of Scotland (1241–1286). The heraldic era in England and Scotland started in about 1215, slightly earlier in Western Europe, and members of the Crovan dynasty are known to have borne ships and lions on their seals; they did not use a triskeles. It is possible that the origin of the Manx triskeles is a knotted device depicted on the coinage of their 10th-century Viking predecessors on the Isle; however, that device is dissimilar to the Manx triskeles, and the nearly 300-year gap between its use and the appearance of the Manx triskeles suggests that there is no connection between the symbols.

=== Possible Sicilian connection ===
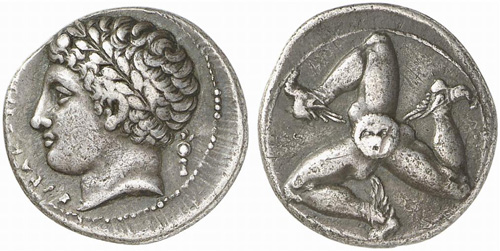
Silver Drachma from Sicily, minted during the reign of Agathocles (361–289 BC), Greek tyrant of Syracuse (317–289 BC) and king of Sicily (304–289 BC). Inscription: ΣΥΡΑΚΟΣΙΩΝ ("Syrakosion") Laureate head of the youthful Ares to left; behind, Palladion. Reverse: Triskeles of three human legs with winged feet; at the center, Gorgoneion

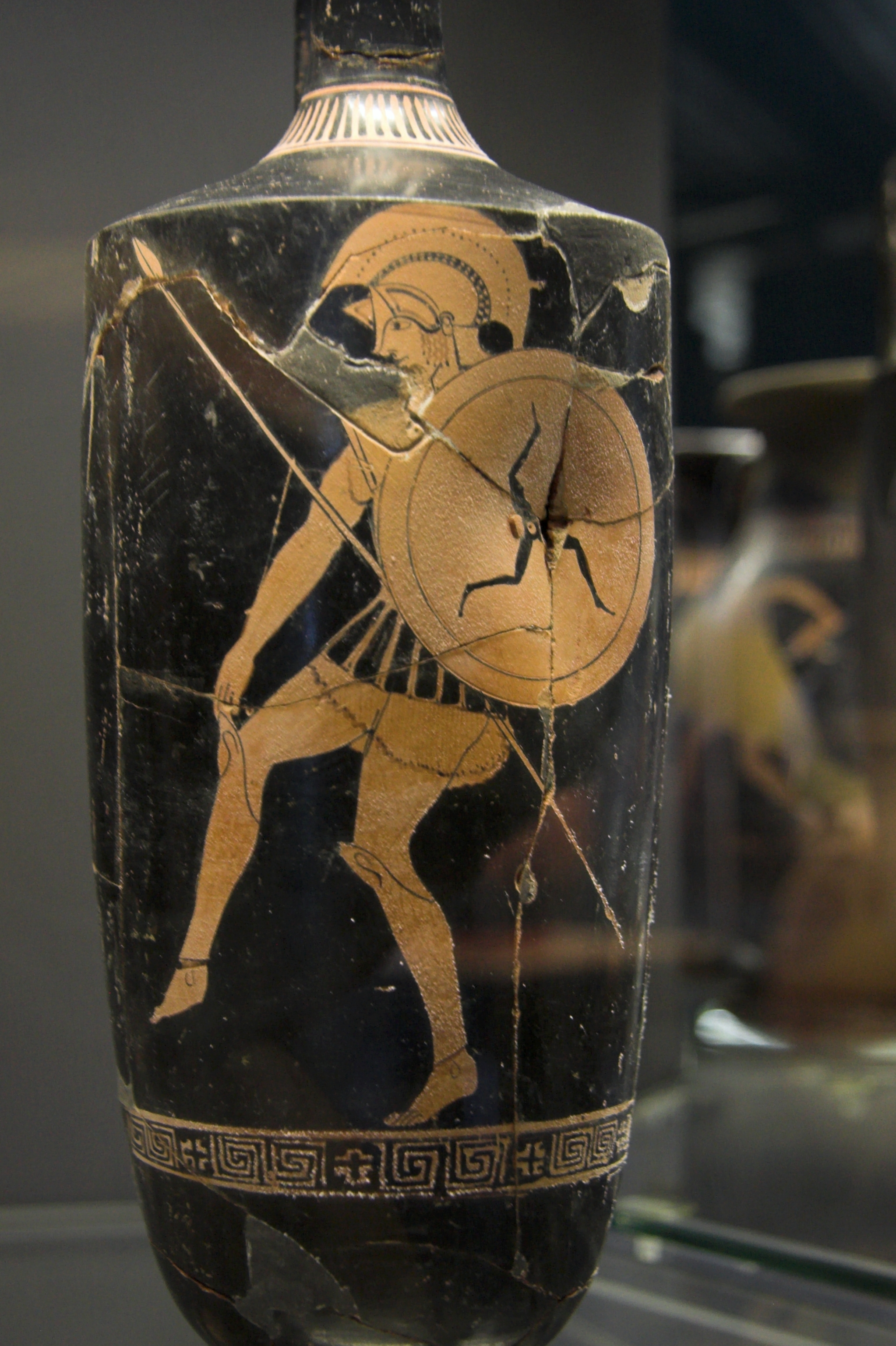
Three-legged symbol of Sicily depicted as a proto-heraldic device on the shield of a Greek warrior. Greek Red Figure lekythos vase, c.470 BC, found in a tomb near Licata, Sicily. Archaeological Museum of Syracuse, Sicily

The appearance on the Isle of Man of the Triskeles in the last third of the 13th century may well be connected with the regime change on the Isle in 1265, from Crovan to Scots kings. The symbol is anciently closely associated with Sicily, well known as a tri-cornered island, and is attested there in proto-heraldry as early as the 7th century BC. The most ancient name for Sicily (then a Greek province) was Trinacria, meaning in Greek three-cornered, triquetra, referring to the triangular shape of the island.

In 1250 the Germanic Frederick II, Holy Roman Emperor, died after having ruled Sicily for 52 years. He was King of Sicily from 1198, King of Germany from 1212, King of Italy and Holy Roman Emperor from 1220 and King of Jerusalem from 1225. His mother Constance was Queen of Sicily and his father was Henry VI of the House of Hohenstaufen. Although there is no evidence that the triskeles was used in Sicily in the 13th century, there is architectural evidence of its use in Austria at that time, almost certainly relating to a personal emblem of Frederick, and almost certainly stemming from his Sicilian connection.

Four years after Frederick's death the pope invested the Sicilian kingship in Edmund Crouchback (died 1296), the second surviving son of Henry III, King of England (died 1272), and for about ten years afterwards Edmund was styled "King of Sicily". Henry invested considerable political capital in his son's new position, and in his efforts to raise funds from taxation to support the dignity of that kingship made himself extremely unpopular with his English nobles, who eventually rebelled.

The wife of Alexander III, King of Scotland, was Margaret of England (died 1275), a daughter of King Henry III. This familial connection between the Scottish royal family and the English rulers of Sicily might account for the introduction of a Sicilian triskeles as a symbol of the Isle of Man. If so, it may well have been adopted as a means to reinforce the regime change on the island.

== See also ==
- List of coats of arms of the United Kingdom and dependencies
- Flag of the Isle of Man
