= Politics of the Isle of Man =

The government of the Isle of Man is a parliamentary representative democracy. The Monarch of the United Kingdom is also the head of state of the Isle of Man, and generally referred to as "The King, Lord of Mann". His representative on the island is the Lieutenant Governor of the Isle of Man, but his role is mostly ceremonial, though he does have the power to grant Royal Assent (the withholding of which is the same as a veto). Legislation of the Isle of Man defines "the Crown in right of the Isle of Man" as separate from the "Crown in right of the United Kingdom".

The Isle of Man is not part of the United Kingdom, and the island has no representation in the UK parliament. As a Crown Dependency, it is not subordinate to the government of the United Kingdom. The UK government, however, is responsible for defence and island's external affairs and could intervene in the domestic affairs of the island under its residual responsibilities to guarantee "good government" in all Crown dependencies. Manx people are British citizens under UK law — there is no separate Manx citizenship.

The legislative power of the government is vested in a bicameral (sometimes called tricameral) parliament called Tynwald (said to be the world's oldest continuously existing parliament), which consists of the directly-elected House of Keys and the indirectly chosen Legislative Council. After every House of Keys general election, the members of Tynwald elect from amongst themselves the Chief Minister of the Isle of Man, who serves as the head of government for five years (until the next general election). Executive power is vested in the Lieutenant Governor (as Governor-in-Council), the Chief Minister, and the Isle of Man's Council of Ministers. The judiciary is independent of the executive and the legislature.

Douglas, the largest town on the Isle of Man (now a city), is its capital and seat of government, where the Government offices and the parliament chambers (Tynwald) are located.

== Executive branch ==
The Head of State is the Lord of Mann, which is a hereditary position held by the British monarch (currently King Charles III). The Lieutenant Governor is appointed by the King, on the advice of the UK's Secretary of State for Justice, for a five-year term and nominally exercises executive power on behalf of the King. The Chief Minister is elected by the House of Keys (formerly by Tynwald) following every House of Keys general election and serves for five years until the next general election.

When acting as Lord of Mann, the King acts on the advice of the Secretary of State for Justice and Lord Chancellor of the United Kingdom having prime responsibility as Privy Counsellor for Manx affairs.

The executive branch under the Chief Minister is referred to as "the Government", and consists of the Council of Ministers, nine Departments, ten Statutory Boards and three Offices. Each Department is run by a Minister who reports directly to the Council of Ministers. This does not include any military positions, as defence is the responsibility of the United Kingdom.

== Legislative branch ==
The Manx legislature is Tynwald, which consists of two chambers or "branches". The House of Keys has 24 members, elected for a five-year term in two-seat constituencies by the whole island. The minimum voting age is 16. The Legislative Council has eleven members: the President of Tynwald, the Bishop of Sodor and Man, the Attorney General (non-voting) and eight other members elected by the House of Keys for a five-year term, with four retiring at a time. (In the past they have often already been Members of the House of Keys, but must leave the Keys if elected to the Council.) There are also joint sittings of the Tynwald Court (the two branches together).

=== Political parties and elections ===
In the 2021 Manx general election, the Manx Labour Party won two seats and the Liberal Vannin Party won one seat; all 21 remaining seats were won by independents.

Most Manx politicians stand for election as independents rather than as representatives of political parties. Though political parties do exist, their influence is not nearly as strong as in the United Kingdom. Consequently, much Manx legislation develops through consensus among the members of Tynwald, which contrasts with the much more adversarial nature of the British Parliament.

The largest political party is the Liberal Vannin Party, which promotes liberalism, greater Manx independence and more accountability in Government.

The Manx Labour Party is unaffiliated to the British Labour Party.

A political pressure group Mec Vannin advocates the establishment of a sovereign republic.

The Isle of Man Green Party, which was founded in 2016, holds two local government seats and promotes Green politics.

The island also formerly had a Manx National Party. There are Manx members in the Celtic League, a political pressure group that advocates greater co-operation between and political autonomy for the Celtic nations.

=== Intervention of the United Kingdom ===
The UK Parliament has paramount power to legislate for the Isle of Man on all matters, but it is a long-standing convention that it does not do so on domestic ("insular") matters without Tynwald's consent.

Occasionally, the UK Parliament acts against the wishes of Tynwald: the most recent example was the Marine, &c., Broadcasting (Offences) Act 1967, which banned pirate radio stations from operating in Manx waters. Legislation to accomplish this was defeated on its second reading in the House of Keys, prompting Westminster to legislate directly.

The UK has had several disputes with the European Court of Human Rights about the Isle of Man's laws concerning birching (corporal punishment) in the case of Tyrer v. the United Kingdom, and sodomy.

== Judicial branch ==
The lowest courts in the Isle of Man are presided over by the High Bailiff and the Deputy High Bailiff, along with lay Justices of the Peace. The High Court of Justice consists of three civil divisions and is presided over by a Deemster. Appeals are dealt with by the Staff of Government Division with final appeal to the Judicial Committee of the Privy Council in the United Kingdom. The head of the Judiciary is the First Deemster and Clerk of the Rolls. The other High and Appeal Court Judges are the Second Deemster, the Third Deemster and the Judge of Appeal, all of whom are appointed by the Lieutenant Governor.

The Court of General Gaol Delivery is the criminal court for serious offences (effectively the equivalent of a Crown Court in England). It is theoretically not part of the High Court, but is effectively the criminal division of the court. The Second Deemster normally sits as the judge in this court. In 1992, His Honour Deemster Callow passed the last sentence of death in a court in the British Islands (which was commuted to life imprisonment). Capital punishment in the Isle of Man was formally abolished by Tynwald in 1993 (although the last execution on the island took place in 1872).

== See also ==
- Royal Commission on the Constitution (United Kingdom)
