= John Joseph Heywood =

First Deemster
- Monarchs: William IV; Victoria
- Governor: Cornelius Smelt; John Ready; Charles Hope
- Preceded by: John Christian
- Succeeded by: Sir William Drinkwater

Personal details
- Born: 19 May 1789 Isle of Man
- Died: 26 May 1855 (aged 66) Douglas, Isle of Man
- Spouse(s): Elinor Rowan (? - 1820, her death); Elizabeth Birtwhistle (? - 1843, her death)
- Children: Elinor Heywood; Elizabeth Heywood
- Profession: Advocate

John Joseph Heywood (19 May 1787 – 26 May 1855) was a Manx lawyer and Member of the House of Keys who successively became Second Deemster and subsequently First Deemster of the Isle of Man.

== Biography ==
=== Early life ===
John Heywood was born on 19 May 1787. By the time of his birth the Heywood family had established themselves as one of the most prominent Manx families, being descended from a former Governor of the Isle of Man, Robert Heywood, who arrived on the Island from Heywood, Lancashire, following his appointment to the governorship in 1678 by William Stanley, 9th Earl of Derby.

=== Professional career ===
Following his schooling Heywood was articled to Peter Hodgson in Whitehaven, Cumberland, from where he took a position in London in order to conclude his legal studies. He subsequently practiced as a solicitor in several Courts of Chancery, King's Bench and Exchequer.

Upon his return to the Island from England, Heywood enrolled as a law student at the Rolls Office, Castle Rushen, subsequently being called to the Manx Bar. After practicing for several years he was raised to the bench in 1821, as Second Deemster, upon the appointment of John McHutchin as Clerk of the Rolls and following the resignation of John Christian, Heywood succeeded him as First Deemster in 1847. It was generally accepted on the Isle of Man at the time that the appointment of Christian as First Deemster in 1823 had been achieved by way of his connection with the Duke of Atholl, and that it had been made over the head of Heywood who was judged by his contemporaries to be more ably suited to the position.

=== Personal life ===
John Joseph Heywood was the second son of Robert Heywood and Elizabeth (née Bacon) and was the half-brother of Calcott Heywood, also a Member of the House of Keys and a Captain in the Royal Manx Fencibles. He was the nephew of Peter Heywood, who was a midshipman on HMS Bounty during its notorious voyage under the command of Captain William Bligh.

Heywood was twice married. His first wife, Elinor (née Rowan), pre-deceased him in 1820 following which he married Elizabeth (née Birtwhistle) who pre-deceased him in 1843. His marriages produced one daughter by each wife. John Heywood was the last of the male line of the family resident on the Isle of Man. Through his father Heywood inherited Bemahauge Farm, which today is Government House, the official residence of the Lieutenant Governor of the Isle of Man. Governor's Bridge, which is near to Government House was originally known as Heywood’s or the Deemster’s Bridge after Deemster Heywood. The bridge gained its present name in 1920 when it was first included in the T.T. course.

=== Death ===
Heywood been ill for many months prior to his death. He died aged 66 at his home on Saturday 26 May 1855.

== Offices of State ==
- Second Deemster, 1821-1847
- First Deemster, 1847-1855
