= John Moore Jeffcott =

Manx politician

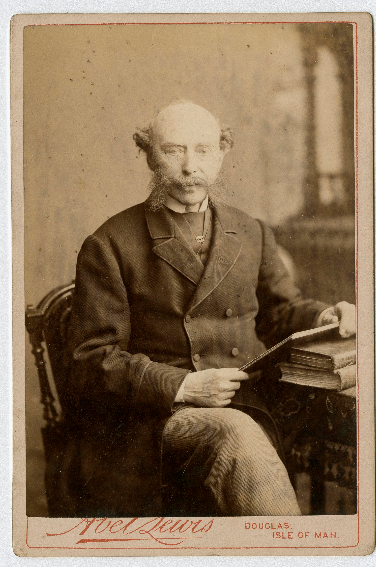
- John Moore Jeffcott, MHK.

High Bailiff of Castletown, Isle of Man
- In office 1865–1892
- Monarch: Queen Victoria
- Governor: Henry Loch
- Preceded by: Sir James Gell
- Succeeded by: James Stowell Gell

Personal details
- Born: 1817 Castletown, Isle of Man
- Died: 17 May 1892 (aged 74–75) Castletown, Isle of Man
- Spouse: Lucy Mylrea
- Children: John Edward Jeffcott, Elanor Catherine Jeffcott, Alma Lucy (Polly) Jeffcott, William Lowther Jeffcott, Maud Mary Jeffcott, Annie Fitzgerald Jeffcott, Charlotte Octavia Jeffcott.
- Profession: Advocate

John Moore Jeffcott QC (1817 – 17 May 1892) was a Manx advocate who became High Bailiff of Castletown and a Member of the House of Keys for the constituency of Castletown.

== Biography ==
=== Early life ===
Descended from both an old Irish family of high connections as well as an old and respected Manx family, John Moore Jeffcott was born in Castletown, Isle of Man in 1817. His father had been a surgeon in the Royal Navy, who following his discharge settled in the south of the Island. Jeffcott's mother was a daughter of the Reverend John Moore, Vicar of Braddan, and a niece of a Manx Deemster. He received his education at Castletown Grammar School and King William's College, being one of the first pupils at that school.

=== Career ===
On completion of his schooling Jeffcott studied law at the Rolls Office, under John McHutchin, and was called to the Manx Bar on May 9, 1839.

For a considerable number of years Jeffcott possessed the largest legal practice in the south of the Isle of Man, and he earned a reputation as a sound and trustworthy lawyer. Following the resignation from the chief magistracy of James Gell in 1865, Jeffcott was appointed High Bailiff of Castletown by the Isle of Man's Lieutenant Governor, Henry Loch. It was said of him that as High Bailiff his conduct upon the Bench was distinguished by the utmost impartiality. As chief magistrate of Castletown he kept a watchful eye over its interests and was always said to be ready to take the lead in any advancement of the town.

Due to his various connections, Jeffcott became the Member of the House of Keys for Castletown in 1855. At this time the House of Keys met in the ancient capital of the Isle of Man, Castletown, and was a self elected body. Under the Governorship of Governor Loch, this self elected body was reformed in 1866, which resulted in the first House of Keys Election Act of 1867. Under the new system Jeffcott was returned as Member for Castletown, as he was again at the 1874 and 1881 elections (these last two occasions unopposed). As a member of the Manx Legislature Jeffcott's temperament and training gave a conservative colour to his opinions and it was said of him that his opinions on local issues were always based on sound experience.

Although he was not the direct driving force, Jeffcott had a substantial influence in the moulding of legislation at a critical period in the history of the Isle of Man, notably in the reform movement which led to the settlement of 1866. Another instance of Jeffcott's service concerned the construction of major works at Douglas Harbour. During the mid 1860s the development of the Port of Douglas was an issue which was said to agitate the entire Island. As a member of the Harbour Board Jeffcott was directly involved with the works proposed by John Coode.

Jeffcott retired from politics in 1882.

=== Personal life ===
John Jeffcott married Lucy Mylrea of Orrisdale in the parish Michael. The marriage produced seven children, five daughters and two sons. His elder son, also named John Jeffcott, became an engineer in Vancouver, British Columbia, in the service of the Pacific Steam Navigation Company. His other son, William Lowther Jeffcott, predeceased him in 1877. Throughout his life Jeffcott had an intense fondness of nature and botany. He was a keen artist, often taking his sketch book with him on his numerous nature walks. In addition he had a strong passion for antiquarian research, being regarded as a competent geologist and archaeologist. In 1878 he became Chairman of the Archaeological Association and in that capacity he became heavily involved in a report concerning the archaeology of the Isle of Man. In addition he also wrote a guide to the mysteries of Castle Rushen. Another work of eminence was his delineation of the character and description of the unique Meayll Stone Circle on Mull Hill and in addition he was highly knowledgeable regarding other historic sites particularly those on Cronk ny Arrey Laa. He was also said to be a keen angler and hunter.

In July 1850 Jeffcott purchased land on the western side of Castletown and on which he constructed his family home, Crofton. It would appear Jeffcott fell on hard times, for in October 1885 he and his wife entered into a deed which assigned and conveyed their real estate to trustees, to be sold to satisfy charges upon it. In respect of Crofton, Jeffcott and his wife entered into another deed of bond and security on a mortgage for £200. The deed contained a provision that if other properties within the deed realised sufficient funds to satisfy the amount outstanding, then Crofton would not be put up for sale and would be retained by the Jeffcotts. Unfortunately this was not the case and on February 5, 1886, the property was sold at auction. Today Crofton is a listed building.

=== Death ===
During the latter part of 1891 Jeffcott began to suffer from declining health. His health continued to worsen into 1892 and he died at his home on May 17.

=== Funeral ===
John Moore Jeffcott's funeral took place at St Mary's Church, Castletown on May 20, 1892. Numerous dignitaries including various Members of the House of Keys and members of the judiciary were in attendance. The funeral service was conducted by the Reverend H.S. Gill. Following the service the body was interred in the churchyard of Kirk Arbory.
