= Mark Quayle =

Mark Quayle may refer to:

- Mark Quayle (advocate, b. 1770) KC, (1770–1804), Clerk of the Rolls of the Isle of Man
- Mark Quayle (advocate, b. 1804) QC, (1804–1879), Clerk of the Rolls of the Isle of Man and Member of the House of Keys
- Mark Quayle (advocate, b. 1841) QC, (1841–1928), Manx-born advocate and businessman
- Mark Quayle (footballer) (born 1978), association footballer
