= Bruce MacPherson =

Bruce MacPherson may refer to:

- Bruce MacPherson (field hockey) (born 1958), field hockey player from Canada
- Bruce MacPherson (judge) (1891–1971), Second Deemster in the Isle of Man
- D. Bruce MacPherson, Episcopal bishop
- Bruce McPherson, American politician
- Bruce McPherson (judge), Australian judge
