= James Gell =

James Gell may refer to:

- James Gell (Clerk of the Rolls) (1823–1905), Manx lawyer, First Deemster and Clerk of the Rolls on the Isle of Man
- James Stowell Gell (1855–1919), son of Sir James Gell. Manx advocate and High Bailiff
