= Thomas Stowell =

Clerk of the Rolls
- In office 1804–1821
- Monarch: King George III
- Governor: John Murray, 4th Duke of Atholl,
- Preceded by: Mark Quayle
- Succeeded by: John McHutchin

Personal details
- Born: 1764 Isle of Man
- Died: 11 June 1821 (aged 56–57) Braddan, Isle of Man
- Spouse(s): Alice Geneste; Elizabeth Callow; Hester Clark
- Children: Nessy; Elizabeth; Amelia; Joseph
- Profession: Advocate

Thomas Stowell KC (1764 – 11 June 1821) was a Manx lawyer who became Clerk of the Rolls of the Isle of Man.

== Biography ==
Thomas Stowell was born in 1764 in the Isle of Man. Descended from a renowned Manx family, Stowell qualified as an advocate. He published the Statute Laws and Ordinances of the Isle of Man in 1792, was sworn in as acting Attorney General of the Isle of Man in 1796, and went on to become Clerk of the Rolls in 1804.

Stowell was married three times. His first marriage was to Alice Geneste; the marriage produced one child. Stowell's second marriage was to Elizabeth Callow. This marriage produced several children, but they all died except for one daughter, Elizabeth, who lived until 1882. His third marriage was to Hester Clark, with whom he had one child, a son, Joseph, who died in 1832.

Stowell's family home was Hampton Court in the parish of Braddan. It was built by Stowell around 1800. After the death of his wife in 1808 he moved to Castletown, but later returned to Hampton Court, where he died on 11 June 1821, aged 57 years.

== Offices of State ==
- Clerk of the Rolls, 1804–1821
