= Thomas Kneen =

Manx judge

Thomas Kneen (1852 – 23 November 1916) was His Majesty's Clerk of the Rolls for the Isle of Man, a Member of the House of Keys for Glenfaba, and Captain of the Parish of Onchan.

Kneen was brought up in a rural and agricultural environment in Andreas. He was educated at Ramsey Grammar School, and subsequently at King William's College. Upon completing his school education he was articled to Alfred Adams, a Douglas advocate. He was admitted to the Manx Bar in 1877 at the age of 24 and commenced practice in Ramsey He soon obtained a reputation as a sound lawyer. In 1880, upon the appointment of Alfred Adams as Clerk of the Rolls, Dickinson invited him to become his partner in one of the largest legal practices in the Isle of Man. His rival at the Bar was the Attorney General.

Kneen also took a considerable interest in politics. In this respect he first came to prominence by persuading the rural electors of the insufficient representation of the town of Douglas in the House of Keys. In 1892 he was returned unopposed to the House of Keys to fill the vacancy in the constituency of Glenfaba. His time in the House was short as his legal duties took up his time and he resigned in 1895. In 1895 he was appointed Captain of the Parish of Onchan, an office he held until his death.

In 1899 Deemster John Gill died and Kneen succeeded him as Second Deemster. He then became First Deemster in 1900 when Deemster Sir James Gell was appointed to succeed Sir Alured Dumbell as Clerk of the Rolls. Then in 1905, on Sir James Gell's death, he became Clerk of the Rolls and senior judge of the Manx High Court. In this judicial capacity he presided in the Chancery Division.

Kneen was also during his time as Deemster and Clerk of the Rolls a Member of the Legislative Council ex officio; he had conservative political views. He was Deputy Governor in 1905 and 1915.

He was also the Chairman of the Trustees of the Estate of Henry Bloom Noble, and was instrumental in the building of the Isle of Man Hospital, a trustee of King William's College and a Justice of the Peace (in fact Chairman of the Justices).

Thomas Kneen died at home in 1916 and was the last Clerk of the Rolls not to be simultaneously First Deemster, as the offices were merged following his death.

== Offices ==
- Clerk of the Rolls, 1905–1926
- First Deemster, 1900–1905
- Second Deemster, 1899–1900
- Member of the House of Keys for Glenfaba, 1892-1895
