= Joseph Cantley =

British High Court judge (1910–1993)

Cantley in 1965, by Walter Bird

Sir Joseph Donaldson Cantley, OBE (8 August 1910 – 6 January 1993) was an English barrister and later a High Court judge. He is most notable for presiding over the trial of Jeremy Thorpe in 1979.

== Early life ==
Cantley was born in Manchester, the elder son of Dr Joseph Cantley, of Crumpsall, and his wife Georgina Kean. His father was a general practitioner. He was educated at Manchester Grammar School and then studied law at Manchester University and the Inns of Court School of Law. In 1933, he came top in his bar finals examination, gaining first-class honours and the Certificate of Honour from the Council of Legal Education. He was then called to the bar from the Middle Temple.

== Legal career ==
Cantley became a barrister in Manchester, serving a pupillage under Denis Gerrard, and then practised on the Northern Circuit.

In 1940, Cantley was commissioned into the Royal Artillery as a second lieutenant and served in the British Army for the rest of the Second World War. He had staff appointments, saw action in North Africa and Italy, and was twice mentioned in dispatches. He was appointed an Officer of the Order of the British Empire (OBE) in 1945, and was demobilised as a lieutenant colonel.

After the war, he returned to the bar, where he had a mixed practice, specialising in contract law cases. He became a Queen's Counsel in 1954 and a Bencher at the Middle Temple in 1963. He served as Treasurer of the Middle Temple in 1981.

In one of Cantley's last trials as a barrister, he led for the prosecution in the case of the murder of John Alan West in 1964, which led to the conviction of Gwynne Evans and Peter Allen and the last two judicial executions in Britain before the abolition of the death penalty in 1965.

== Judicial career ==
Cantley was briefly Recorder of Oldham, from 1959 to 1960; then Judge of the Court of Record in the Hundred of Salford, 1960 to 1965; and Judge of Appeal in the Isle of Man High Court from 1962 to 1965. He was appointed as a High Court judge in 1965, allocated to the Queen's Bench Division, and received the customary knighthood.

Cantley was Presiding Judge on the Northern Circuit from 1970 to 1974. He had a low public profile until he presided at the trial of Jeremy Thorpe in May–June 1979, shortly after the 1979 UK general election on 3 May 1979 - so much so that no press agency could find a photograph of him. Thorpe was acquitted by the jury, after Cantley's summing up had roundly condemned the prosecution witnesses and praised the defendants, while claiming not to express an opinion.

At the 1979 Secret Policeman's Ball, in aid of Amnesty International, the biased summing up speech by Mr Justice Cantley was parodied by Peter Cook. The sketch was written and delivered shortly after the trial and was, according to Freeman and Penrose, "actually not that different from the original." The nine-minute opus, "Entirely a Matter for You", is considered to be one of the finest works of Cook's career. Cook and show producer Martin Lewis brought out an album on Virgin Records entitled Here Comes the Judge: Live of the live performance together with three studio tracks that further lampooned the Thorpe trial. Notwithstanding marked and widespread public disquiet at the biased summing-up in the Thorpe trial, Cantley was considered as Presiding Judge on the South Eastern Circuit, but declined in order to become Treasurer of Middle Temple in 1981.

== Personal life ==
In December 1966, at Saffron Walden, Cantley married Hilda Goodwin Gerrard, born Jones, the widow of his former pupil-master Sir Denis Gerrard, who had died in January 1965. He gained one step-son. After retiring from the bench in 1985, he lived with his wife in the Temple and attended the Temple Church.

Cantley died in the City of London on 6 January 1993, aged 82, after several years of ill health. His wife Hilda died on 11 September 1995, aged 95.
