= Mike Kerruish =

Manx politician

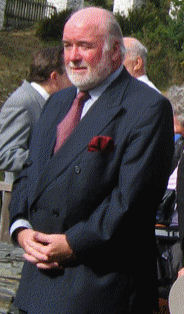
- Kerruish in 2007.

First Deemster and Clerk of the Rolls
- In office 2003 – 14 July 2010
- Monarch: Elizabeth II
- Governor: Ian Macfadyen
- Preceded by: William Cain
- Succeeded by: David Doyle

Personal details
- Born: 2 November 1948 Isle of Man
- Died: 14 July 2010 (aged 61) Isle of Man
- Party: Independent
- Spouse(s): Marianne Butt (m. 1973–2010, his death)
- Children: 1 son, 1 daughter
- Profession: Judge

His Honour John Michael Kerruish QC (2 November 1948 – 14 July 2010) was a Manx lawyer, who was the First Deemster and Clerk of the Rolls on the Isle of Man.

== Early life ==
Born on 2 November 1948 to John Daniel and Olive Mona Kerruish, he was educated at Douglas High School for Boys, and later went on to study at University of Leeds.

== Career ==
He acted as Deputy Governor and as the Lieutenant Governor for a period of about a month in 2005. Formerly he was the Second Deemster and prior to that Attorney General and thus sat in the Legislative Council.

== Deemster Kerruish Award ==
The Deemster Kerruish Award was created two days after Kerruish's death. This award is to be presented "to the young lawyer who has shown most endeavour and progress in the preceding year".

== Personal life ==
Kerruish married Marianne (née Butt) in 1973. They remained together until his death in July 2010. They had 1 son and 1 daughter together.

== Death ==
He died of cancer at Hospice Isle of Man on 14 July 2010 at the age of 61.

Government offices
Preceded by I.D. Macfadyen	Lieutenant Governor of the Isle of Man (Acting); 2005	Succeeded by Sir Paul Haddacks
