= Vicar General of Sodor and Man =

The Vicar General of the Diocese of Sodor and Man is an ecclesiastical law officer appointed by the Bishop of Sodor and Man.

Formerly there were two vicars general in the diocese, but since 1846 only one has been appointed.

The Vicar General is the judge of the ecclesiastical courts in the Isle of Man, which comprise the Consistory Court, the Chapter Court and the Vicar General’s Court. The principal jurisdiction of the Consistory Court is to consider applications for faculties to works affecting consecrated land or buildings; its former matrimonial jurisdiction was transferred to the High Court of Justice in 1884, and its jurisdiction in clergy discipline to disciplinary tribunals in 2006. Churchwardens are sworn in before the Chapter Court, which may hear presentments against clergy or churchwardens; its former probate jurisdiction was transferred to the High Court in 1884. The Vicar General's Court formerly dealt with affiliation (bastardy) cases, but the jurisdiction was transferred to the High Bailiff in 1921 and the court no longer sits.

Formerly, the Vicar General retired on a vacancy in the See (i.e. on the retirement, death or translation of the bishop); a temporary appointment during the vacancy was made by the Lieutenant Governor, and a fresh appointment was made by the new bishop when he took office. The appointment is now made by the bishop alone, and the office is permanent, with an age limit of 70 (although the tenure may be extended to age 75).

The Vicar General is also Chancellor of the diocese, the titles being interchangeable, and the bishop's Official Principal. Until 1919, the Vicar General was a member of the Legislative Council and as such had a seat and vote in Tynwald.

== Vicars General ==
- Howard Connell, since 2019
- Geoffrey Tattersall, 2014 - 2019
- Clare Faulds, 1996 – 2014
- Peter William Stanley Farrant, until 1995
- Ramsey Gelling Johnson, from 1931
- Cyril Hughes-Games, 1906 – 1931
- Charles Thomas Cheslyn Callow, 1903 – 1905
- Samuel Harris, 1884 – 1903
- Benjamin Philpot, 1828 – 1832
- William Roper, 1824 – 1825; 1826 – 1828
- Sir William Crow, 1578 - 1626 jointly with Sir William Norris (Note: Clerks were Standish)
- Sir William Norris, 1578 - ? jointly with Sir William Crow (Note: Clerks were Standish)
