= Alfred Walter Adams =

Manx lawyer

Clerk of the Rolls
- In office 1879–1882
- Monarch: Queen Victoria
- Governor: Henry Loch, 1st Baron Loch, Sir Spencer Walpole
- Preceded by: Mark Quayle
- Succeeded by: Sir Alured Dumbell

Personal details
- Born: Isle of Man
- Died: Port Erin, Isle of Man
- Profession: Advocate

Alfred Walter Adams, QC was a Manx lawyer who became the Clerk of the Rolls on the Isle of Man.

== Biography ==
Adams was involved in the public life of the Isle of Man for over 25 years. He was articled to John Bluett, who was a leading advocate then practising on the Isle of Man. A member of a Debating Society which held its meeting in a room in Fort Street, Douglas, Adams won respect for his skills in debate spending considerable time working on his case.

Adams at once made his mark in his profession his progress said to have been steady and speedy, with Adams subsequently defending George Dumbell in the Chancery Court. He was appointed as Deputy Attorney General by Charles Ogden, however on Ogden's death in 1866 the vacant post of Attorney General was filled by Sir James Gell. Continuing in practice, Adams was appointed Clerk of the Rolls of the Isle of Man in 1879.

For the last five years of his life, Adams was said to have been in declining health. He was predeceased by his wife, her death being said to have had a profound effect on him.

Alfred Adams died at his home on the evening of Saturday 18 November 1882.

== See also ==
- Clerk of the Rolls
