= John Quayle =

John Quayle is the name of the following people:

- John Rodney Quayle (1926–2006), British microbial biochemist and Vice Chancellor of University of Bath
- John Quayle (actor) (born 1938), English actor
- John Quayle (advocate, b. 1693) (1693–1755), Manx lawyer who became the Clerk of the Rolls on the Isle of Man
- John Quayle (judge, born 1725) (1725–1797), Manx-born advocate who succeeded his father as Clerk of the Rolls
- John Quayle (politician) (1868–1930), American politician
- John Quayle (rugby league) (born 1947), Australian rugby league footballer and administrator
- John Quayle Cannon (1857–1931), American newspaper editor and a general authority of the Church of Jesus Christ of Latter-day Saints
- John Quayle-Dickson (1860–1945), Manx military officer
