= David Doyle (judge) =

Manx judge

David Doyle is a Judge of the Grand Court of the Cayman Islands, Financial Services Division. He was, until 31 July 2018, the First Deemster, Clerk of the Rolls and Deputy Governor of the Isle of Man. He was appointed in 2010 and was formerly a partner of Dickinson Cruickshank & Co from 1985 onwards. He was called to the Bar (Gray's Inn) in 1982 and the Manx Bar in 1984.

He spent his formative years in Hong Kong, where he was educated at Island School. He attended King William's College in the Isle of Man from September 1974 to July 1978.

He graduated from the University of Newcastle with a degree in law in 1981.

In November 2010 it was announced that he would take up the position of First Deemster following the death of Michael Kerruish earlier in the year. Doyle was sworn in on 20 December 2010.

In 2010 he produced a book titled Manx Criminal Law and Procedure, dealing with all areas of criminal law in the Isle of Man.

On 18 November 2011, he was appointed as a Bencher of Gray's Inn.

It was announced in February 2018 that Doyle would stand down from the position of First Deemster in July 2018 and return to private practice. He was succeeded by Andrew Corlett.

== Judiciary positions ==
- Second Deemster, 2003-2010
- First Deemster and Clerk of the Rolls, 2010–2018
