= John Kewish =

Last person executed in the Isle of Man

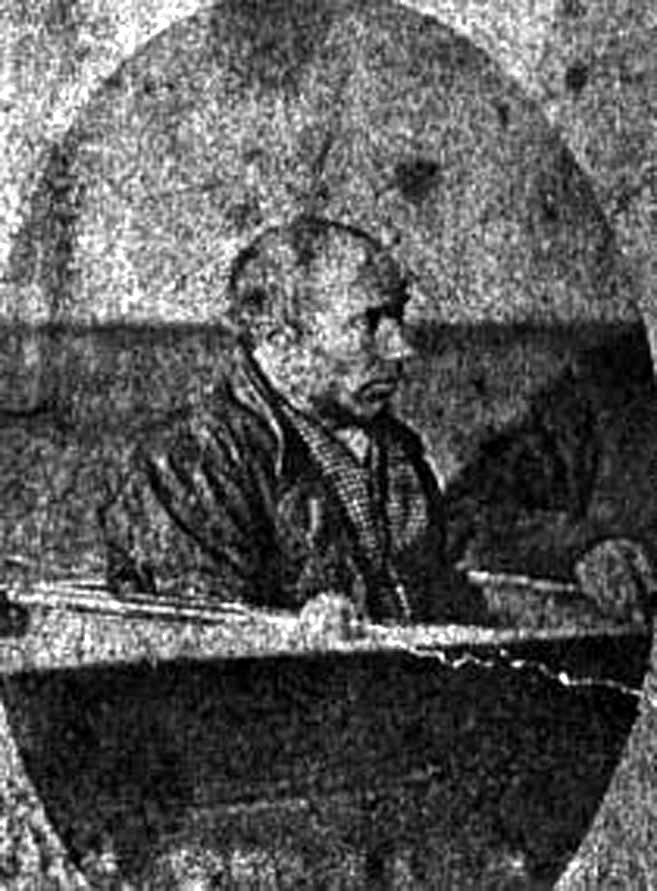
Kewish at trial, c. 1872

John Kewish Jr. (died 1 August 1872) (pronounced "Kyowsh") was the last person executed in the Isle of Man. He was convicted and executed for the crime of patricide.

Sentences of death would be continually issued, the last in 1992, on the Isle of Man, but Kewish's sentence was the last to be carried out.

== Background ==
Prior to his arrest, John Kewish Jr. lived on a farm with his elderly parents. He was the eldest of seven siblings and was unmarried. Kewish's father, John Kewish Sr., was found dead in his home on 28 March 1872. Kewish Jr., who had a history of crime including sheep stealing, was arrested at the family home and charged with patricide. He was described as mentally disabled.

== Depositions ==
According to depositions, the body was found on the evening of 28 March by the victim's wife, Mary Kewish, and a neighbour. The following day the family moved the body, washed it, and prepared it for burial. It was not until 30 March that someone decided to contact the police. On 31 March a police doctor examined the body and noted six wounds (four on the back and two on the chest) which he felt were caused by three thrusts from a small pitchfork. Thomas Kewish, John Jr.'s brother, also admitted there was an ongoing argument between John and his father. The police felt this was strong enough evidence to arrest John Jr.

== Trials ==
Kewish was tried twice before a jury. At his first trial his only defence was that he had not committed the crime. After 14 hours of deliberation the jury was unable to reach a verdict. A new trial was ordered when the jury foreman became ill and deliberations could not continue. There is evidence that a majority of this first jury believed Kewish to be either innocent of the crime, or so simple-minded that he was not responsible for the act. (According to one of the jurors, seven of the twelve believed he was not guilty.) At Kewish's second trial his advocates added the further plea of not guilty by reason of insanity, submitting that either he had not committed the crime or if he had, his mental disability freed him of responsibility. Insanity was later supported by an examining physician's statement that Kewish's mind was unable to comprehend the moral turpitude of such a criminal act. After an hour's deliberation the jury convicted him of patricide. The presiding deemster, William Drinkwater, sentenced Kewish to the mandatory punishment of death by hanging.

== Post-trial ==
Although convicted, Kewish hoped to receive leniency from the British Government. The Lieutenant-Governor received several sworn statements intended to encourage leniency, including from the jurors of the first trial, his examining physician, and others. Kewish's post-trial statements were inconsistent. At one point Kewish's gaoler stated that Kewish admitted he had accidentally shot his father and hid the weapon in the thatch of an outhouse (where a bird gun was later found). At other times Kewish repeated his claims of innocence and requested a free pardon. The pitchfork had not been clearly identified; however, the Home Secretary advised the Queen that he could not recommend mercy. He felt the crime was premeditated, and committed from greed, and added that neither the deemster nor the jury had recommended mercy at the trial.

Manx law at the time required the British Crown to order the execution by positive act. Queen Victoria was displeased with this, and she indicated this in a letter to the Home Secretary. He apologised and promised to bring Manx law into compliance with that of England, which did not require such an order. Although expressing personal doubts about the case, she took his advice and indicated that the execution was to proceed.

== Execution ==
Locally, there was reluctance to become involved in the execution. Craftsmen initially refused to build the gallows, and an executioner, William Calcraft, had to be brought over from England to carry out the sentence. Kewish was hanged in Castle Rushen at Castletown on 1 August 1872 and he is buried there. It was the only non-public execution to take place under Manx law.

== Aftermath ==
It was not until 1993 that Tynwald abolished capital punishment in the Isle of Man. Five people were sentenced to death (for murder) on the island between 1973 and 1992, but all death sentences after Kewish's were commuted to life imprisonment by the Home Secretary of the United Kingdom using the Crown's Prerogative of Mercy.

== See also ==
- Capital punishment in the Isle of Man

== General references ==
- Steve Fielding (1994). The Hangman's Record: Volume One 1868–1899 (Beckenham, UK: Chancery House Press, ISBN 0-900246-65-0) p. 23
