= John Needham (disambiguation) =

John Needham was an English biologist and Catholic priest.

John Needham may also refer to:

- John Needham (Manx Judiciary), legal officer in the Isle of Man
- John R. Needham (1824–1868), American politician, lawyer, and newspaper editor
- Jack Needham (1887–1961), English footballer
