= Robert Kingsley Chappell =

Robert Kingsley Chappell, KC (29 November 1884 – 11 August 1937) was an English barrister and judge.

The son of George and Emily Chappell, of Wimbledon, Chappell was educated at Leeds Grammar School, Merchant Taylors’ School, Crosby, and the University of Liverpool (LLB). He passed the Law Society's final examinations in 1906, before heading to the bar. He was called to the bar by the Inner Temple in 1909 and joined the Northern Circuit. During the First World War, he saw active service from 1915 and was twice mentioned in despatches.

Chappell was appointed a KC in 1929. He was made acting Deemster of the Isle of Man in 1934 in order to sit with Sir Harold Derbyshire KC (Judge of Appeal) on Kaye Don's appeal against conviction and sentence for manslaughter by Deemster Farrant. The same year, he succeeded Derbyshire, who had been appointed Chief Justice of Bengal, as Judge of Appeal of the Isle of Man. He was elected a bencher of the Inner Temple in 1937, but died at the Ramsey Cottage Hospital the same year while on holiday on the Isle of Man.

Chappell married Constance Mary, eldest daughter of Thomas Smith, of Birkdale, Lancashire; they had two sons and a daughter.
