= Jayne Hughes =

Jayne Hughes is a British jurist who was High Bailiff of the Isle of Man (the senior stipendiary magistrate) from 2019 until retiring in 2023. She had previously served as Deputy High Bailiff on the Isle of Man since 2011.

== Early life and career ==
Hughes served briefly in the Thames Valley Police before getting married and moving to Liverpool. After her second child began school, Hughes obtained a LLB Honours First Class at the University of Liverpool at the University of Liverpool as an adult student. She worked at the Attorney General’s Chambers and with the Crown Prosecution Service. She worked to implement the "Simple, Speedy Summary Justice" initiative with the Crown Prosecution Service in England before being seconded to the Chambers of the Attorney General in the Isle of Man.

== High Bailiff ==
In 2011, Hughes was appointed as Deputy High Bailiff and in 2019 was appointed as High Bailiff, succeeding John Needham. She is believed to be the first woman to hold a full-time salaried position in the Manx Judiciary. She received her appointment from Adam Wood, then Lieutenant Governor of the Isle of Man.

In her capacity as Coroner of Inquests, (Note: On the Isle of Man, the Coroner of Inquests is always the High Bailiff or the Deputy High Bailiff.) Hughes found that a gold and crystal ring discovered on the Isle of Man in December 2020, bearing the insignia of James Stanley, 7th Earl of Derby, was legally "treasure" under the Treasure Act 2017. (Note: See Treasure Act 1996 for equivalent legislation which applies only to England, Wales and Northern Ireland.)

Hughes announced in September 2022 that she was stepping down as High Bailiff, with the government conducting interviews in November of that year. She was replaced in that position by James Brooks, the Deputy High Bailiff since 2021, who was sworn in after her official retirement in April 2023.
