= Stewart Stevenson (disambiguation) =

Stewart Stevenson is a Scottish politician.

Stewart Stevenson may also refer to:

- Stewart Stevenson Moore, Manx advocate, First Deemster and Clerk of the Rolls
- Stewart (Beavis and Butt-head), a fictional character
- Stewart & Stevenson, a company in Houston, Texas

== See also ==
- Stewart (disambiguation)
- Stevenson
