= Isle of Man Bank =

Bank on the Isle of Man

The Royal Bank of Scotland International Limited trading as Isle of Man Bank
- Type: Division of RBS International
- Industry: Financial services
- Founded: 26 October 1865; 160 years ago
- Headquarters: Douglas, Isle of Man
- Key people: Ryan Smith - Head of Retail Banking Isle of Man Bank & NatWest International
- Products: Banking, insurance, mortgages
- Owner: NatWest Group
- Website: www.iombank.com

The Isle of Man Bank is a bank in the British Crown dependency of the Isle of Man, providing retail, private and business banking services to the local population. Incorporated in 1865, it has operated as a trading name of RBS International since 2019. It is licensed by the Isle of Man Financial Services Authority in respect of deposit taking and investment business and registered as a general insurance intermediary.

== History ==
The earliest Manx bank began business in 1802 at Bridge House, Castletown. Formed by George Quayle, Mark Quayle, John Taubman and James Kelly, it was also known as the Isle of Man Bank. The company carried on trading until 1818.

Founded by Samuel Harris, Henry Noble, William Moore and William Callister, the Isle of Man Banking Co. Ltd. was established at Athol Street, Douglas, on 26 October 1865. It was the first limited liability company enrolled on the register following the passage of the Companies Act 1865. The bank was acquired by National Provincial Bank in 1961 and became a subsidiary of National Westminster Bank upon the merger of National Provincial with Westminster Bank in 1968, joining the Royal Bank of Scotland Group in 2000, when NatWest was acquired by the smaller Scottish bank. RBS Group was renamed NatWest Group in 2020.

On 21 May 2019, the High Court of Justice of the Isle of Man granted approval to transfer the business and undertakings of Isle of Man Bank Limited to the Isle of Man branch of The Royal Bank of Scotland International Limited (trading as Isle of Man Bank); these changes came into effect on 28 May 2019.

== Services ==
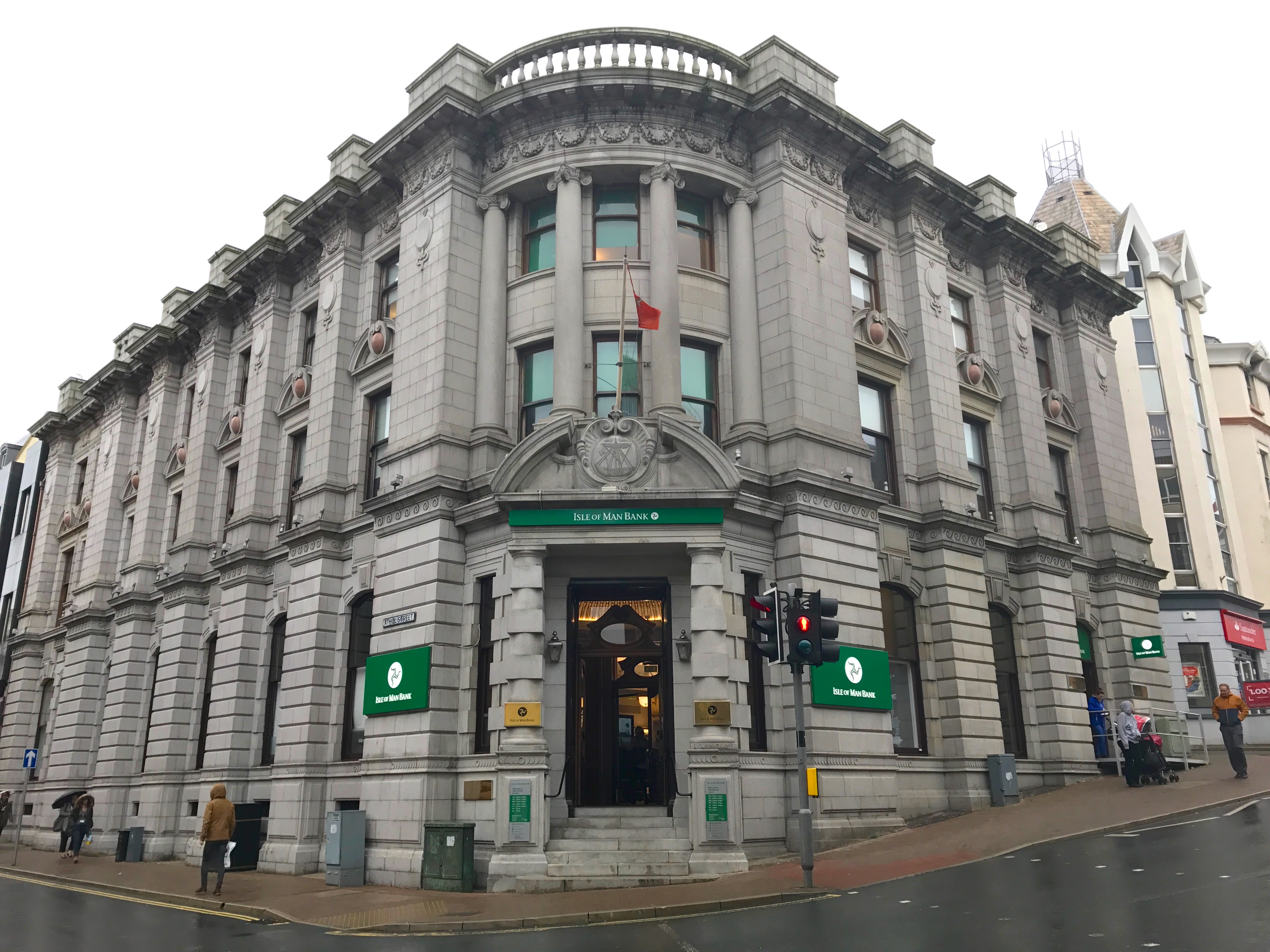
The Head Office (in Douglas) of the Isle of Man Bank.

As of 2023 the bank has four branches on the island: Douglas Athol Street, Douglas Regent Street, Ramsey, and Port Erin. There is also a mobile branch named Penny, which visits places on the island that do not have a branch, including Kirk Michael, Laxey, Onchan, Ballaugh, Cooil Business Park (Braddan) and Ballasalla.

The Isle of Man Bank handles the issuing and management of Manx banknotes on behalf of the Isle of Man Government.

The Isle of Man Bank has closed several branches since 2000. These include the branches at Kirk Michael (closed 2012), Laxey sub-branch (closed 2013), Ballasalla, Onchan and Prospect Terrace in Douglas (closed 2015), and Castletown and Peel (closed 2021).

Isle of Man Bank is a member of the Isle of Man Depositors’ Compensation Scheme as set out in the Depositors’ Compensation Scheme Regulations 2010.

== See also ==
- List of banks in the Isle of Man
- NatWest Markets
