= Capital punishment in the Isle of Man =

There is a long history of capital punishment in the Isle of Man. Until the 17th century, many convicted prisoners were executed at Hango Hill.

Capital punishment in the Isle of Man was formally abolished in 1993. The Isle of Man is a British Crown Dependency, but not part of the United Kingdom (which had effectively abolished capital punishment in 1965).

The last person to be actually hanged on the Isle of Man was John Kewish, at Castletown in 1872. No execution had taken place on the island during the three decades before that. Capital punishment was not abolished by Tynwald (the island's parliament) until 1993. Several people were sentenced to death (for murder and various other crimes) on the Isle of Man between 1873 and 1992, with a much publicised case in 1972, of a fast food employee beating his boss to death with a fire extinguisher, forcing the local court in Douglas to issue a mandatory death sentence. However, The Lord of Mann, Queen Elizabeth II exercised her Royal prerogative of mercy to commute the sentence to life imprisonment. Further murder cases followed in 1982, a case of infanticide, and in 1992 (Teare). The legal code of the Isle also permitted birching long after its abolition in Britain, although the courts were expected to refrain from inflicting it.

The last person to be sentenced to death on the Isle of Man (and anywhere in the British Isles) was Anthony Robin Denys Teare, at the Court of General Gaol Delivery in Douglas, in 1992. Teare was paid £ 600 to kill Corinne Bentley, the victim of a family row. Teare lured her to a remote spot and cut her throat with a modelling knife. Teare claimed he needed the money to pay off a bank overdraft. The case was heard before the Second Deemster of the Isle of Man, Henry Callow. Deemster Callow thus became the last judge in the British Isles to pass a death sentence (but chose not to wear a black cap whilst doing so). Following sentencing, Teare engaged a new lawyer, Louise Byrne, who immediately took the case to the appeal court, where the conviction was quashed. A retrial was ordered, and a search for new evidence was made.

At the second trial, Teare was represented by Peter Thornton QC, an English counsel. William Kelly, a prison healthcare officer at the Isle of Man Prison, gave evidence that Teare had told him on a number of occasions how he had murdered the victim, Corinne Bentley. It was on his evidence alone that Teare was convicted of murder for the second time. He entered the history books as the last person in the British Isles to be sentenced to death and the first in the Isle of Man to be sentenced to life imprisonment (all previous life sentences had been commuted from death sentences). The judge made note of Teare's experience as the (probably) last man sentenced to death under British rule, and also of the unlikeliness it would have been carried out, under the particular procedure called the "dance" of crime, conviction and commutation. Corinne's brother was in court as Teare, head bowed, was sentenced to a minimum of twelve years' imprisonment. He was sent to HMP Wakefield in Yorkshire.
