= Michael Moyle =

Michael Moyle may refer to:

- Michael Moyle (magistrate), magistrate and High Bailiff of the Isle of Man
- Michael Moyle (baseball), Australian baseball player
- Mike Moyle, member of the Idaho House of Representatives

== See also ==
- Michael Moyles, Gaelic footballer
