= Jack Corrin =

First Deemster of the Isle of Man (1932–2019)

John William Corrin CBE (6 January 1932 – 6 April 2019) was a First Deemster of the Isle of Man.

== Biography ==
He was educated at King William's College. He was called to the Manx bar in 1954. He rose to Senior Partner at Dickinson Cruickshank & Co.

He served as Attorney General and Member of the Legislative Council of the Isle of Man from 1974 to 1980, when he became Second Deemster. He succeeded as First Deemster and Clerk of the Roles in 1988, serving until 1998.

He was appointed a Commander of the Order of the British Empire in the 1995 Birthday Honours.

In 1998, he was elected a Freeman of the Borough of Douglas.

He died on 6 April 2019 at the age of 87.

== Judiciary positions ==
- Attorney General, 1974-1980
- Second Deemster, 1980-1988
- First Deemster and Clerk of the Rolls, 1988-1998
