= Law of the Isle of Man =

The legal system on the Isle of Man is Manx customary law, a form of common law. Manx law originally derived from Gaelic Brehon law and Norse Udal law. Since those early beginnings, Manx law has developed under the heavy influence of English common law, and the uniqueness of the Brehon and Udal foundation is now most apparent only in property and constitutional areas of law.

== Precedent ==
Manx law has a distinct system of insular binding precedent based on cases brought before the Island's courts. Precedents in the English legal system, when relevant and applicable, are persuasive upon the Manx courts. The supreme court for the Isle of Man is the Judicial Committee of the Privy Council. The Isle's traditional local appellate court is the Staff of Government Division.

== Statute ==
In addition to precedent, the laws of the Island develop through statute from two main sources: Acts of Tynwald (known as insular legislation) and Acts of Parliament in Westminster.

The power of the United Kingdom Parliament, and its predecessor the English Parliament, to legislate directly for the Isle of Man has a long history, and significantly pre-dates the 1765 revestment of the Island to the British Crown. One such example of English legislation applied to Man was the Bishoprics of Chester and Man Act 1541, which attached the Diocese of Sodor and Man to the Province of York. The judgement in the Derby Dower Case (1523) clarified the extension of English statutes to the Isle of Man, stating that a reference to the Island was required: "no general Act of Parliament extended to the island, but that by special name an Act might extend to it".

The apparent requirement for an explicit reference to the Isle of Man within an Act of Parliament was rejected by the Staff of Government Division in Attorney-General v Harris & Mylrea (1894) wherein they ruled that the clear intention of Parliament to extend an Act to the Island was sufficient.

Therefore, English (and, later, UK) legislation does not by default extend to the Isle of Man. In most cases it will be specifically applied to the Island (today done by the use of an Order in Council), and this is customarily done with the consent and approval of Tynwald. It has been held by the Judicial Committee of the Privy Council (on 5 August 1663 in William Christian's case) that Acts of Parliament can also automatically apply to the Isle of Man by 'necessary implication'.

Today, Acts of Parliament are adopted by the Isle of Man to avoid unnecessary duplication, or where a consistent approach is essential because of an international aspect to the issue (the UK has a responsibility for the external affairs of the Island).

=== Relationship between insular and Parliamentary statutes ===
The relationship between the statutes of Tynwald and Parliament is unclear. For many centuries and until comparatively recently, it was assumed that Acts of Parliament were the supreme law of the Isle of Man. Manx courts would disapply any part of an Act of Tynwald that conflicted with an Act of Parliament applicable to the Island, even if the Act of Tynwald was a later law.

It is ... not contended, if as a fact Imperial Acts and Measures do apply to the Island either in whole or in part, that the Insular Legislature could effect any limitation or alteration of that application.

— Judgment of Deemster Farrant in Re Robinson, 22 April 1936

All three [Crown dependencies] are tenants at will of their constitutional privileges. These privileges could be terminated at any time by legislation of the Imperial Parliament. Parliament also has the power of imposing any less charge upon them, and incidentally of imposing financial legislation upon them, whatever constitutional or political objections there might be to doing so.

— Statement by HM Treasury, 1925

From the early 1980s, the Staff of Government Division began to assert that there was no hierarchy of legislative acts, and Tynwald and Parliament were concurrent and coequal. This departure from previous practice has not yet been tested by appeal to the Privy Council.

The constitutional relationship was tested when the Isle of Man, supply based for Radio Caroline, rejected the Marine, &c., Broadcasting (Offences) Act 1967, but the legislation was extended to the island anyway by an Order in Council. This resulted in some protests and talk of independence in the Manx legislature, but no consequential action.

== Notable differences in current laws ==
Despite the heavy English influences on Manx law, increasingly the island has "gone its own way". Much of its legislation mirrors that of the UK to a greater or lesser extent (and may be rubber-stamped by the two branches of Tynwald with little or no debate) but much does not.

In the past there have been (and in some cases still are) key differences on

- the death penalty for murder (abolished in the UK in 1973, on the Isle of Man in 1993 – although after 1973 it was the policy of the UK to block all Manx executions)
- women's suffrage (1881 on Mann, 1928 in the UK)
- judicial birching (abolished 1947 in the UK, on Mann in 2000; last used in 1976)
- sodomy (legalised 1967 in England and Wales, 1992 on Mann)
- speed limits – while the Island has speed limit laws (and indeed in general has road traffic laws much like those of the UK) more than half its roads are derestricted – that is to say they have no specific speed limit.
- taxation – the taxation rates in the Isle of Man are far lower. There is no Corporation Tax, no Capital Gains Tax, no inheritance tax, and a 20% top rate of income tax (which is capped so that a resident earning £10 million would be paying just the same as a resident earning £1 million).

== See also ==
- Judiciary of the Isle of Man
- Legislative Council (Isle of Man)
- Tynwald
- Isle of Man Constabulary

== Other sources ==
- Augur Pearce, "When Is A Colony Not A Colony? -- England And The Isle Of Man", 32 Common Law World Review 368 (2003)
- Peter W. Edge, Manx Public Law (1997)
- K.F.W. Gumbley, "Extension of acts of Parliament to the Isle of Man", 8 Manx Law Bull. 78 (1987)
- Peter W. Edge, "David, Goliath and Supremacy: The Isle of Man and the Sovereignty of the United Kingdom Parliament", 24 Anglo-American Law Review 1, 22 (1995)
- The Ancient Ordinances and Statute Laws of the Isle of Man. J Quiggin. Douglas. 1841. Google Books
