= James Stowell Gell =

James Gell
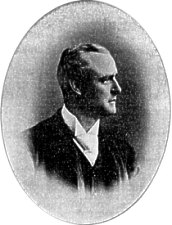
- James Stowell Gell

Personal details
- Born: 20 April 1855 Castletown, Isle of Man
- Died: 23 September 1919 (aged 64) Castletown, Isle of Man
- Spouse: Emily Bainton
- Children: James Bainton Stowell Gell
- Profession: Advocate

James Stowell Gell QC (20 April 1855 – 23 September 1919) was a Manx advocate who became High Bailiff of both Castletown and Douglas, Isle of Man.

== Biography ==
=== Early life ===
The second of four sons to Sir James Gell and Amelia Marcia Gell (née Gill), James Stowell Gell was born in Castletown, Isle of Man on Friday 20 April 1855. Like his father before him, James Gell was educated at King William's College, Castletown, Isle of Man and on completion of his education he entered as student-at-law with the object of being admitted to the Manx Bar.

=== Career ===
Articled to the law firm of his father, who was then Her Majesty's Attorney General of the Isle of Man, he qualified in 1878. He at once entered into partnership with his father, Sir James, the firm being known as Gell and Gell and having an extensive family and court practice. He remained in association with his father as a practicing advocate until 1897, when Sir James Gell was appointed First Deemster.

During an illness which affected his father during the 1890s, he acted as Attorney General, and in such capacity it fell on him to lead for the Crown in the prosecution of George Cooper on a charge of having murdered his wife at the Regent Hotel, Douglas. His junior on the occasion was James Murray Cruikshank High Bailiff of Ramsey.

On 5 May 1892 Gell was appointed High Bailiff of Castletown in succession to John Jeffcott, and on 8 August 1905, on the resignation of Samuel Harris, Gell was appointed High Bailiff for Douglas. It was said of him that he discharged his magisterial duties with great acceptance and with conspicuous fairness.

As High Bailiff he was ex-officio chairman of the Licensing Courts for the districts of Castletown and Douglas.

During the period following the death of Clerk of the Rolls, Thomas Kneen, and the appointment of Sir William Kyffin Taylor as special Judge of Appeal in the Isle of Man, Gell acted as a member of the Court of Staff of Government, and as such he sat during several cases of appeal from decisions of the Common Law Division of the High Court.

=== Personal life ===
On 25 August 1887 Gell married Emily Bainton, the youngest daughter of William Bainton of Beverley Park, Beverley, Yorkshire. The marriage produced one son, James Bainton Stowell Gell, who was drafted overseas in August 1918 and killed in action on 9 October 1918, aged 19.

Regarded as a proud Castletonian, Gell assisted in the development of Castletown and from the time he was a young man he took a leading part in Castletown public affairs. Said to have been a highly charitable person, together with his wife Gell worked to provide assistance to the poor members of the community.

Although a man of strong conviction, Gell never failed to accept the right of one person to differ from another, even when the difference was with himself.

A communicant of the Established Church, like his father before him, Gell championed liberty of religious conscience for all.

=== Death ===
The death of his son was said to of affected Gell very deeply. In the early spring of 1919, he contracted a virus and gradually started to become weaker, although he continued to attend to his office. His condition worsened, and from early May he was confined to his house. Gell died at this home, Westwood, The Crofts, Castletown, on 23 September 1919. He was survived by his wife.

=== Funeral ===
Gell's funeral took place on Friday 26 September. Those in attendance included the Chief Constable of the Isle of Man, Colonel Madoc; members of the Bar; Sir Hall Caine; the Vicar General of the Isle of Man and all Justices of the Peace.

Following the service James Gell's body was interred in the family vault in Malew Parish Churchyard.
