= Government House, Isle of Man =

Coordinates: 54°10′24.63″N 4°27′56.97″W

Government House
- Thie yn Reiltys
- Flag of the Lieutenant-Governor of the Isle of Man, flown at Government House
- Interactive map of the Government House area
- Former names: Bemahague Farm

General information
- Type: Official residence
- Location: Governor's Road, Onchan, Isle of Man
- Current tenants: Lieutenant Governor of the Isle of Man
- Owner: Government of the Isle of Man

Government House is the official residence of the Lieutenant Governor of the Isle of Man. It is situated on Governor's Road in Onchan, Isle of Man. Government House is also used to provide accommodation for official guests to the Isle of Man, and is used extensively for official functions, such as receptions and dinners. The property has been the official residence of the Lieutenant Governor since 1863 and has been owned by Tynwald since 1903.

== History ==
=== Bemahague Farm ===
The house was originally built as Bemahague Farm between 1820 and 1830. The name Bemahauge has both Norse and Gaelic elements, which possibly means the estate pre-dates the early Norse settlements of the 9th century.

The prefix be is derived from the Norse by, which is found in a large number of Manx place names and literally means large farm or estate. The remainder of the name is Gaelic in origin and is from "Mac Thaidhg", meaning "son of Taig". The Taig family are believed to have been the original holders of the estate and the old name of Taig has been altered into the modern Keig.

Long in the possession of a branch of the prominent Onchan family of Christian, the earliest mention of it is in the manorial roll of 1511, where Edmund McCorkell is shown as holding it and paying a Lord's rent. By 1600, the estate was held by a branch of the Christian family. The Christians lived and farmed at Bemahague until 1789 when Edward Christian was forced to sell the property in order to redeem a mortgage.

The bulk of estate was sold for £1,000 to Robert Heywood, who was a wealthy Douglas merchant and Water Bailiff. Edward Christian had retained the mansion house along with other houses and outbuildings, but following his death less than a year later, these were also sold to Robert Heywood for a further £720.

The Heywoods were a prominent family in the Isle of Man during this time, and Deemster Peter Heywood, a brother of Robert Heywood, lived at the nearby property Glencrutchery House in the adjacent quarterland of that name. Robert Heywood was the uncle of Peter Heywood, who was the midshipman on HMS Bounty.

Robert Heywood never occupied Bemahague himself, but instead he let the property to various tenants until his death in 1809, when it passed to his son, Deemster John Joseph Heywood. Governor's Bridge, which is near Government House, was originally known as "Heywood's" or the "Deemster's Bridge" after Deemster J. J. Heywood. The bridge gained its present name in 1920, when it was first included in the T. T. course.

Deemster Heywood let the property to an English gentleman called Joshua Farrer who was a friend of the Earl of Sandwich. During his tenancy, Joshua Farrer undertook a considerable amount of rebuilding works on the property, which took on the Regency style and completely altered its appearance.

In a guide to the Isle of Man dating from 1836, titled A Six Day's Tour, By a Stranger, Bemahague was said to be "charmingly situated, commanding a fine view of the whole bay: the old house should be taken down, and a new one built in the abbey style; the situation deserves a good mansion".

A number of reports on Government House have said the property was rebuilt between 1820 and 1830; however this comment about the "old house" could suggest that in 1836 the old Christian family farmhouse still stood on the site and that Joshua Farrer's alterations had not yet taken place.

After the death of Deemster John Joseph Heywood in 1855, Bemahague passed to his married daughter Mrs. Elinor Daly (sometimes spelt "Daley"). On her death in 1861, she left the estate to her son Francis David Daly who was a minor when he inherited. In 1863, while Francis Daly was still an adolescent, his Trustees leased the property to the Lieutenant Governor, Henry Brougham Loch.

=== Government House ===
Although Castletown was the capital of the island until it was transferred to Douglas in 1874, mid-19th century Douglas was a rapidly expanding commercial town with excellent sea links, and it is little wonder that the new Lieutenant Governor should wish to reside near the town.

The Lordship of Mann has been vested in the Crown since 1765, when the British Government reclaimed it from the Duke of Atholl with the Act of Revestment in order to put an end to smuggling which was causing them financial losses. Historically, the custom was to have a Governor and a Lieutenant Governor who served underneath him. However, the Lieutenant Governor ceased to have a superior after the Lieutenant Governor Colonel Cornelius Smelt, who had served under Governor Atholl, was given the title in 1830.

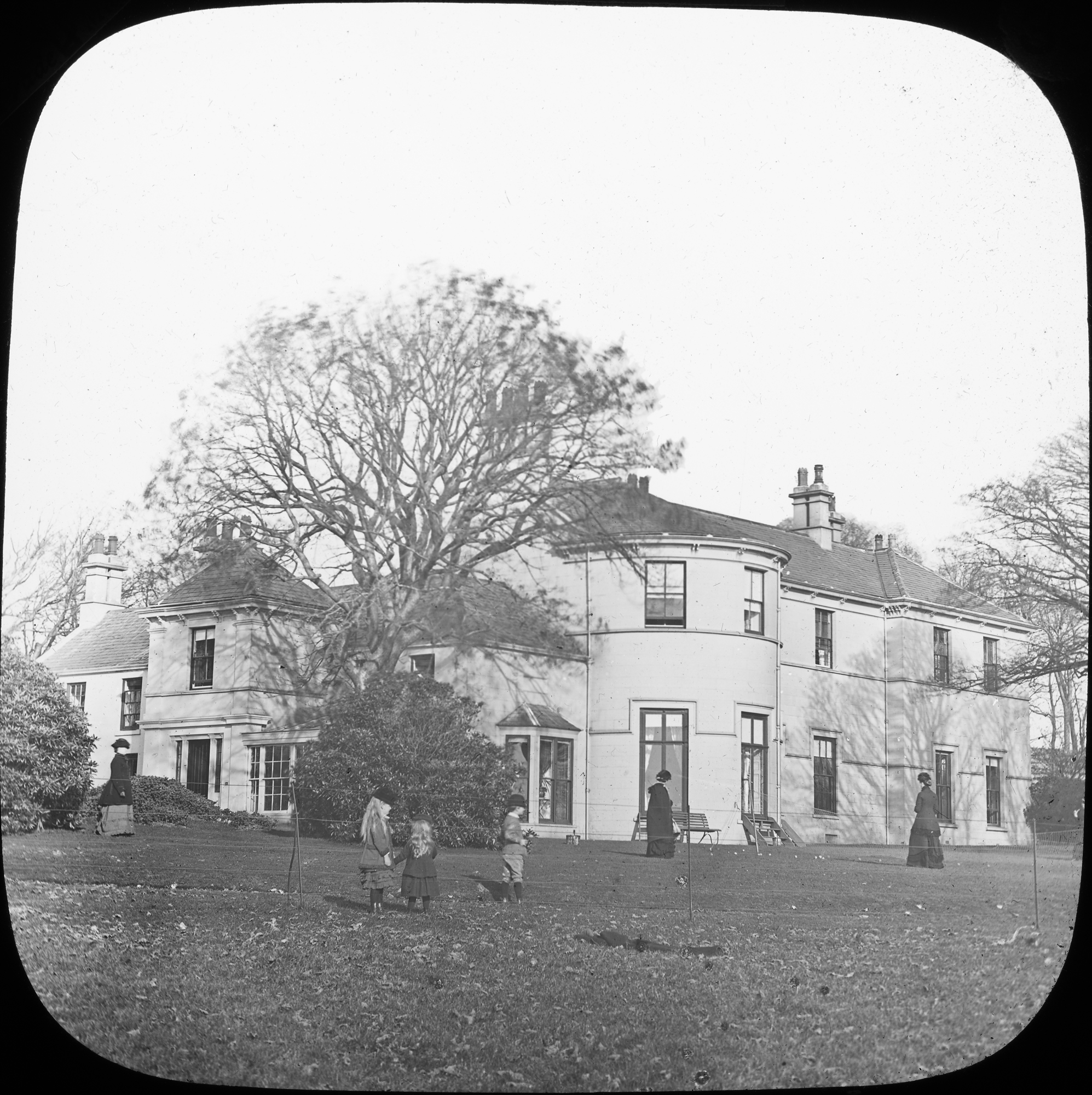
View of the residence circa 1880

In 1871, Tynwald passed an Act confirming the lease of Bemahague to the Treasurer of the Isle of Man for 21 years at an annual rental of £200. The lease stipulated that the Daly family were to contribute £1,000 towards the cost of any alterations and repairs which were deemed necessary in order to make the property a suitable residence for the Lieutenant Governor. In February 1871, the Liverpool architect Gustavus Hamilton was engaged to produce plans for alterations and extensions to the property. These alterations took nine months to complete, during which time the Governor was a guest at Bishopscourt.

Prior to Bemahague, the official residences of the Governor included prominent buildings such as Lorne House in Castletown, Castle Mona and the Villa Marina in Douglas.

In 1882, the owner of Bemahague, Francis David Daly, died and he left the estate in trust for his son, John Joseph Heywood Daly.

In 1886, there were negotiations for Tynwald to purchase Bemahague from John Joseph Heywood Daly. However, Mr. Daly was then still a minor and did not have the power to sell. As a result of this, in 1890 Tynwald signed a lease of the property for a further 21 years and voted an additional £1,000 for alterations in order to extend the guest and servant accommodation. The subsequent alterations were carried out in 1890 by the local architect and builder, James Cowle. These included breaking through the wall between the drawing room and the dining room and fitting folding doors so that the two rooms might be thrown into one, while a bay was built onto the reception room and a smaller one to the dining room. Additional servants' bedrooms were also created by rebuilding the kitchen wing as a two-storey extension.

In 1891, the lease was transferred to the newly appointed Government Property Trustees. A report in 1900 revealed that the property was costing about £200 annually for repairs, in addition to the rental charge. As a consequence of this, in July 1903 a Tynwald committee proposed that the house along with 112 acres of adjoining land should be purchased for a cost of £12,000; and on 24 November 1903, Mr. John Joseph Heywood Daly sold the property to Tynwald for that sum.

Despite the previous alterations to the property, further work was carried out as it was not yet considered to be satisfactory as an official residence for the Lieutenant Governor. Internally, the main problems were said to be the small entrance hall and the awkward position of the reception rooms; externally, it was the proximity of the old farmhouse and stables to the main house. The subsequent alterations and extensions were carried out between 1903 and 1906 to the design of the architectural partnership of William Edward Willink and Philip Coldwell Thicknesse of Liverpool; amongst whose other commissions was the Cunard Building.

The front or south western end of the house was pulled down and extended so that the reception rooms and study were enlarged, while a new hall, porch and main staircase were constructed. Various small outbuildings were removed and the farmyard was relocated. The stables were demolished and the cow house was converted into a stable and coach house. These changes saw great improvements to the property, which was further enhanced when the property was connected to the main water supply, rather than the water being hand-pumped from two old wells.

By 30 January 1906, all of the improvement works to Government House had been completed.

In 1914, there was a fire in the servants' quarters. The portion which was destroyed in the fire was the oldest part of the house with its small rooms and low ceilings, so the opportunity was taken to rebuild the accommodation and provide improved facilities.

Inside Government House, several Governors' ladies have left their mark. In the late 1920s Lady Hill installed the crystal chandeliers from Paris which are in the reception rooms. In 1945 Lady Granville embroidered a bedspread and satin hangings with the Royal Coat of Arms for the Tynwald room for the visit of King George VI and her sister, Queen Elizabeth, the late Queen Mother. In the 1960s Lady Garvey added embroidery to the soft furnishings.

The bell of HMS Manxman, which served with the Royal Navy as a minelayer during the Second World War, is on display in the hall of Government House. The inscription on the bell reads: "This bell was given by the people of the Isle of Man in memory of one of its greatest sailors, Captain John Quilliam R.N. who served in HMS Victory at the Battle of Trafalgar, 1805".

The coat of arms which is over the entrance doors is thought to have originally been in the old Custom House in Peel. Over the years, Government House has been updated and remodelled at various times whilst also accommodating the changing tastes and needs of successive Governors and their ladies.

== Today ==
Many visitors pass through Government House each year, including foreign ambassadors, politicians, and residents of the island, both young and old. Functions hosted by the Lieutenant Governor range from formal ceremonies to lunches, receptions and dinners.

== See also ==
- Government House - elsewhere in the Commonwealth or British Overseas Territories
- Government Houses of the British Empire and Commonwealth

== Sources ==
Bibliography

Books

- Hulme, P.J.; Government Houses in the Isle of Man
- Kitto J.; Historic Homes of the Isle of Man (1990).
- Kniveton G.N.; The Onchan Story (1992).
- Kniveton G.N.; An Illustrated Encyclopaedia of the Isle of Man (1997).
- Slack S.; Streets of Douglas – Old and New (1996).
- P. Tutt; An Introduction to the Architecture of the Isle of Man (2013).

Articles

- A Six Day’s Tour through the Isle of Man, By a Stranger; (1836).
- Manx Millennium – Part 1, January 1999.
- Manx Millennium – Part 5, May 1999.
