= Faulds =

Faulds can refer to:

- Andrew Faulds (1923-2000), British actor and politician
- Clare Faulds (born c. 1949), Manx lawyer and vicar
- Henry Faulds (1843-1930), Scottish scientist who is noted for the development of fingerprinting
- Kristopher Faulds (born in 1994), Scottish footballer
- Richard Faulds (born in 1977), British sport shooter
- William Frederick Faulds (1895-1950), South African recipient of the Victoria Cross
- Faulds (plate armour), a form of plate armour protecting the hips
