= Stephen Harding (disambiguation) =

Stephen Harding was an English-born monk, abbot, and Christian saint.

Stephen Harding may also refer to:

- Stephen Harding (cricketer), mid 18th-century English cricketer
- Stephen S. Harding (1808–1891), Governor of the Utah Territory
- Stephen E. Harding (born 1955), British biochemist
- Stephen Harding (barrister) (fl. 2010s), Attorney General for the Isle of Man
- Stephen Harding (politician) (fl. 2010s), politician from the U.S. state of Connecticut
