= Stewart Stevenson Moore =

Manx lawyer

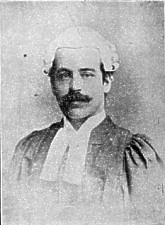
- Stewart Stevenson Moore

First Deemster and Clerk of the Rolls
- Monarch: Victoria. Edward VII. George V
- Governor: John Henniker-Major, 5th Baron Henniker, Lord Raglan, Sir William Fry
- Preceded by: Thomas Kneen
- Succeeded by: Charles Callow

Personal details
- Born: 1 January 1860 Isle of Man
- Died: 28 March 1951 (aged 91) Chelsea, London
- Profession: Advocate

Stewart Stevenson Moore QC (1 January 1860 – 28 March 1951) was a Manx lawyer, who was the First Deemster and Clerk of the Rolls on the Isle of Man.

== Biography ==
Stewart Stevenson Moore was born in Peel, Isle of Man, on New Year's Day, 1860. He hailed from an old and established Manx family, of Lhergydhoo in the Parish of German. His father, the Reverend John Stevenson Moore, was Vicar of Dagenham, Essex and his grandfather John Stevenson Moore (1804–1896) had been a Member of the House of Keys for Glenfaba and a Wesleyan preacher. As a consequence of his father's vocation, Stevenson Moore was brought up in England; however the family maintained a strong connection with the Isle of Man.

Stevenson Moore went up to Keble College, Oxford, where he took his BA and MA He was admitted to the Middle Temple in 1883 and practised on the South Eastern Circuit, specialising in tithe and common law. In 1900 Stevenson Moore succeeded Thomas Kneen as Second Deemster, subsequently being appointed First Deemster following the death of Sir James Gell in 1905. On the death of Deemster Kneen he became Clerk of the Rolls in 1916.

As a Deemster, Stevenson Moore was an ex officio member of the Legislative Council of the Isle of Man, and he was Chairman of the Local Government Board and chairman of the board of Agriculture.

Upon his retirement as First Deemster and Clerk of the Rolls in 1921, Moore returned to live in England. However he returned to the Isle of Man in 1931 to preside over the retrial of a case of negligence against the Highway Board. This was the first time a Deemster had emerged from retirement to hear a lawsuit in the island's High Court. His return was due to an invitation from the Lieutenant Governor of the Isle of Man, Sir Claude Hill who was asked to appoint a special judge for the retrial of a protracted lawsuit.

Before the court assembled on Friday 17 July 1931, Stevenson Moore was sworn in by the then Clerk of the Rolls, Deemster Frederick LaMothe. This was the second time in his career that Stevenson Moore had taken the ancient "herring bone oath" to deal justly and indifferently between party and party "as the herring backbone doth lie in the midst of the fish".

=== Death ===
Stevenson Moore died at his home at 32 Hans Place, Chelsea on 28 March 1951. Following his funeral his body was cremated at Golders Green Crematorium.

== Offices of State ==
- Second Deemster, 1900–1905
- First Deemster, 1905–1916
- First Deemsters and Clerk of the Rolls, 1916–1921
