= Arthur Luft =

Manx politician

Arthur Christian Luft CBE (21 July 1915 – 21 June 2009) was a Manx judge, a former First Deemster and Clerk of the Rolls and a Member of the Legislative Council of the Isle of Man.

He first set up practice in the Isle of Man in 1947 and in 1972 was appointed Attorney General and thus sat on the Legislative Council ex officio. In 1974 he was made Second Deemster before being promoted to First Deemster, Clerk of the Rolls and Deputy Governor in 1980. He was the first First Deemster not to have an ex officio seat in the LegCo, the right having been removed by an Act of Tynwald in 1980. He retired as Deemster in 1988 but was elected by the House of Keys to sit on the Legislative Council, which he did for 10 years before retiring in 1998. He was appointed CBE in the 1988 Birthday Honours.
