= Judiciary of the Isle of Man =

The lowest courts in the Isle of Man are the summary courts, Coroner of Inquests, Licensing Court, Land Court, etc. These courts are presided over by magistrates. There are two stipendiary magistrates, the High Bailiff and the Deputy High Bailiff, along with lay justices of the peace.

The superior court of the Isle of Man is the High Court of Justice of the Isle of Man, consisting of a Civil Division and an appeal division, called the Staff of Government Division. The judges of the High Court are the deemsters, appointed by the King (acting on the advice of the Secretary of State for Justice in the United Kingdom), and the judicial officers, appointed by the Lieutenant Governor. The High Bailiff and the Deputy High Bailiff are ex officio judicial officers, and additional judicial officers (full-time or part-time) may be appointed.

Civil matters are usually heard at first instance by a single deemster sitting in the High Court.

Criminal proceedings are heard at first instance before either the High Bailiff or the Deputy High Bailiff or a bench of lay magistrates, in less serious cases. More serious criminal cases are heard before a deemster sitting in the Court of General Gaol Delivery; in a defended case the Deemster sits with a jury of seven (twelve in cases of treason or murder).

Civil and criminal appeals are dealt with by the Staff of Government Division. Appeals are usually heard by a deemster (the one not involved with the case previously in the High Court or Court of General Gaol Delivery) and the Judge of Appeal.

Final appeal is to the Judicial Committee of the Privy Council in the United Kingdom. This dates back to an ancient right of the Manx to appeal to the Crown of England against the decisions of the Lord of Mann, who in previous times was the supreme insular legal authority, and was explicitly confirmed by the Privy Council in their decision of Christian v. Corren in 1716, several years before revestment.

One special case, that also applies to the Channel Islands, is the jurisdiction of the King's Bench Division of the English High Court over the island in matters of habeas corpus. This dates back to the ancient right of the King to at any time have an account as to why the liberty of any of his subjects was restrained, and operated in the Isle of Man pre-revestment, as it did across all the King's dominions despite the other competencies of the Kings's Bench being restricted to England.

== See also ==
- Manx law
- Isle of Man Constabulary
- Tynwald
