= Iain Glidewell =

The Right Honourable Sir Iain Glidewell

Lord Justice of Appeal

Justice of the High Court

Sir Iain Glidewell PC (8 June 1924 – 8 May 2016) was a Lord Justice of Appeal and Judge of Appeal of the High Court of the Isle of Man. He was made a privy councillor in 1985.

He was educated at Bromsgrove School and Worcester College, Oxford where he was later made an Honorary Fellow. At Gray's Inn, one of the four English Inns of Court, he held the positions of Treasurer (1995), and Master of the Bench.

In 1997 he was commissioned by the British government to review the Crown Prosecution Service. His report made recommendations to maximise efficiency within the prosecution process. Glidewell maintained his opinion that, in the United Kingdom, QCs should be appointed following the recommendation of a panel chaired by a retired Law Lord or a Lord Justice of Appeal until his death.

He died on 8 May 2016, aged 91.
