= Alastair Montgomerie =

Manx judge

Alastair Aitken Montgomerie was the Criminal Deemster of the Isle of Man from 2011 until his retirement on 16 December 2019. He was appointed as a Deemster by the Lieutenant Governor.

Montgomerie was educated at Fettes College Edinburgh, Manchester University and the College of Law and was admitted as a Solicitor of the Supreme Court of England and Wales on 2 July 1979.

From 1980 to 1991 Montgomerie was involved in a wide range of criminal cases in England. He went to the Isle of Man in 1991 and worked within the Attorney General's Chambers.

Between June 2003 and April 2011 Montgomerie held the position of Deputy High Bailiff and acted as a panel Deemster, from time to time presiding over numerous General Gaol matters.

Montgomerie is married and has two adult sons.
