= John Cosnahan =

Isle of Mann magistrate

John Cosnahan (1754–1819) was the first High Bailiff of Douglas, Isle of Man, and Deemster. He was the eldest son of Hugh Cosnahan and Eleanor Finch (1753–1799).

In 1781, as a member of the House of Keys, he was sent to London to speak on behalf of the Island. He spoke so powerfully in the House of Lords on 13 June that year that he helped prevent a Bill proposed by the Duke of Athol to pay extra compensation to the Duke for handing the Island over to the Crown.

In 1808 he became a Water Bailiff or Judge of the Admiralty Court.

In the last few months of his life he was made a Deemster or stipendiary magistrate, although his appointment was delayed by the opposition of the Duke.

== Family ==
John married his cousin Catherine Finch and they had eight children, a daughter and seven sons, but none of them produced an heir. His children were:

- John Finch (1794–1885), Lawyer, unmarried
- Michael (1790–1883), Captain R.N., served as a midshipman under Nelson, and later earned distinction in the Crimean War. He died aged 85, and is buried at St Peter's in Thanet. He was married, but childless.
- Hugh (d. 1822), Captain R.N. He was married and had two sons. One, Charles, died in infancy. The other, George, was in the Navy, but while still a midshipman was drowned.
- Augustus died young and unmarried.
- Philip (1793/4-1814) lived a short but eventful life. As a midshipman in the Navy he was aboard HMS Shannon and was mentioned in dispatches following the capture of USS Chesapeake. He was drowned in Liverpool Bay and was buried in his uncle's vault in St James, Liverpool.
- James Mark (1794–1817), advocate, and took over his father's office. He died, however, just before his father, and was buried at Braddan.
- Mark James (1793–1812) entered the service of the East India Company (military branch) and died in India.
