= Clare Faulds =

Manx lawyer and vicar

Vicar General of Sodor and Man
- In office 1996–2014
- Monarch: Elizabeth II
- Preceded by: Peter William Stanley Farrant
- Succeeded by: Geoffrey Tattersall

Personal details
- Born: 1949 or 1950 (age 76–77) Isle of Man
- Profession: Advocate

Clare Faulds (born 1949/50) is a Manx lawyer and former Vicar General of Sodor and Man. She was the first woman admitted to the Manx bar and has also worked in the Falkland Islands.

== Career ==
Faulds qualified as an advocate of the Isle of Man Law Society in 1973. She was the first woman admitted to the Manx bar. She has also worked as the Vicar General of Sodor and Man from 1996 until 2014. In a 2001 discussion, she said that exhuming bodies when people move houses was not symptomatic of a decline in faith. In 2004, Faulds left the Isle of Man to take up a senior magistrate role in the Falkland Islands. She took the role partly due to her interest in wildlife. As a senior magistrate, Faulds dealt with around five criminal cases a week, as of 2006. She later worked as acting Supreme Court judge, before moving back to the Isle of Man.

In 2011, Faulds spoke at an event to explain the Manx political system prior to the Isle of Man general election. In 2014, Faulds returned to the Falkland Islands to work as a senior magistrate and coroner and also left her role as Vicar General of Sodor and Man. In this role, she was also the senior magistrate for the British Antarctic Territory, until she was succeeded by Martine Kushner in December 2016. In 2015, she was the judge for a case involving allegations of misreported catches of fish. In 2016, she was judge for a case of illegal animal waste disposal. From 2018 to 2020, she worked as an interim Senior Magistrate.

Faulds has also worked as Chairman of the Isle of Man Income Tax Commissioners, and for Britannia International Limited, the Isle of Man subsidiary of Britannia Building Society.

== Personal life ==
Faulds is married with three sons, one of whom is a doctor. Her husband has worked as a senior editor of the Manx Hansard, and as the canon precentor of Peel Cathedral on the Isle of Man. Faulds has a master's degree in canon law from Cardiff University. In 2010, Faulds gave a talk about wildlife in the Falklands Islands. In 2012, she joined the Rotary Club of Douglas.
