= John Gill (judge) =

Manx judge

John Frederick Gill (? - 15 October 1899) was a Second Deemster of the Isle of Man.

Deemster Gill was born in Sicily but educated at King William's College. On leaving the college, he studied law with his second cousin Sir James Gell and was admitted to the bar in 1864. He was elevated to the bench as Second Deemster in 1884.

He also compiled the Manx Statutes from 1417 to 1896 into 6 volumes - a painstaking task. He took a great interest in religious, social, and archaeological matters, and was an ardent Manx patriot. He collaborated with his brother, W H Gill and Dr. Clague in the publication of the Manx National Song Book.

" I found him always, from the beginning of his study of the law, most painstaking, straightforward, and upright, with respect to whatever he had to do. He formed strong opinions on matters with which he was concerned, both professional and otherwise, and nothing would move him to swerve from what he considered to be right. Mere expediency never, I believe, influenced him. As a judge, he won the respect and admiration of the Bar, for the advancement of whose interest he was always a warm advocate, and I am sure it will be accorded to him by all that he acted judicially with the strictest impartiality. He had the sincere esteem of his colleagues on the Bench.

— Sir James Gell

== Offices of State ==
- Second Deemster, 1884-1899
