= Mark Quayle (advocate, b. 1841) =

Mark Hildesley Quayle

Personal details
- Born: 1841 Isle of Man
- Died: 3 November 1928 (aged 86–87) Slough, Berkshire
- Profession: Advocate

Mark Hildesley Quayle, QC (1841 – 3 November 1928) was a Manx lawyer and the second son of Mark Hildesley Quayle a former Clerk of the Rolls on the Isle of Man and a Member of the House of Keys.

== Biography ==
=== Career ===
Quayle was the second son of Mark Hildesley Quayle (1804–1879) and Mary Quayle (née Spedding). His father, grandfather, great-grandfather and great-great grandfather had all served as the Clerks of the Rolls on the Isle of Man, being part of a prominent Manx family who had held official positions in the Government of the Isle of Man continuously for over 200 years.

Quayle was schooled at King William's College and St John's College, Cambridge following which he practiced as a solicitor in London. He acquired extensive property interests Cumberland in addition to Crogga, the mansion house at Port Soderick, Isle of Man which he inherited from his father.

Mark Quayle died at his residence, Dial House, Slough, Berkshire on 3 November 1928. His body was buried in Cumberland.

== See also ==
- Mark Quayle (advocate, b. 1770) KC, (1770–1804)
- Mark Quayle (advocate, b. 1804) QC, (1804–1879)
