= Andrew Williamson (judge) =

Andrew Williamson was the Deputy Deemster of the Isle of Man. Andrew Williamson was born in Douglas in December 1946 and brought up in Kirk Michael. He was educated at Michael School and then his local Secondary school, Ramsey Grammar School, before leaving the island to study law at Nottingham Regional College of Technology. He then joined the Middle Temple and was subsequently called to the bar.

After being called to the bar, he practiced in and around London and became deputy clerk to the justices in inner London for two years before becoming clerk to the justices in Ashford, Kent. He then returned home and was appointed Deputy High Bailiff. He went on to become High Bailiff and an Acting Deemster for 6 years before become Deputy Deemster, specializing in family law, landlord and tenant and contract cases. He retired on 6 January 2008.

== Judicial positions ==
- Deputy High Bailiff, 6 January 1988 – January 1995
- High Bailiff, January 1995 - 1 September 2002
- Deputy Deemster, 1 September 2002 – 6 January 2008
