= Judge of Appeal (Isle of Man) =

Part-time judge in the Isle of Man High Court

The Judge of Appeal is a judge in the Isle of Man High Court who only sits in the Staff of Government Division, the appeal court.

The position was created by the Judicature (Amendment) Act 1918 which also amalgamated the offices of First Deemster and Clerk of the Rolls. The judge must be an English King's Counsel.

The current Judge of Appeal is Jeremy Storey KC; formerly a part-time position, this has been full-time since 2017.

== Judges of Appeal ==
- Sir Francis Taylor KBE KC, 1918–1921
- Arthur Ashton KC, 1921–1925
- Ernest Wingate-Saul KC, 1925–1928
- John Singleton KC, 1928–1933
- Major Harold Derbyshire MC KC, 1933–1936
- Robert Kingsley Chappell KC, 1936–1938
- John Morris CBE MC KC, 1938–1947
- Lieutenant-Colonel Patrick Barry MC KC, 1947–1950
- Denis Gerrard QC, 1950–1953
- Neville Laski QC, 1953–1956
- Robertson Crichton QC, 1956–1961
- Daniel Brabin MC QC, 1961–1962
- Joseph Cantley OBE QC, 1962–1965
- Major Richard Bingham TD QC, 1965–1972
- Lieutenant-Colonel Cecil Clothier QC, 1972–1979
- Iain Glidewell QC, 1979–1980
- Benet Hytner QC, 1980–1997
- Geoffrey Tattersall QC, 1997–2017
- Jeremy Storey KC, 2017–Present

== See also ==
- Deemster
- Isle of Man High Court
- Clerk of the Rolls
- Manx Judiciary
