= List of banks in the Isle of Man =

List of banks registered on the Isle of Man, based on the list of licensed banking institutions from the Isle of Man Financial Services Authority:

== List ==
Bank trading names	Company	Domicile
Capital International Bank	Capital International Bank Limited	Douglas, Isle of Man
Santander International	Abbey National Treasury Services plc	(United Kingdom) London, England
Barclays Bank	Barclays Bank plc	(United Kingdom) London, England
Cayman National Bank; Cayman National Wealth; Cayman National; CN Aviation; CN Sea	Cayman National Bank (Isle of Man) Limited	Douglas, Isle of Man
Conister Bank Agri-Finance; Conister Bank	Conister Bank Limited	Douglas, Isle of Man
HSBC Bank	HSBC Bank plc	(United Kingdom) London, England
Investec	Investec Bank (Channel Islands) Limited	St Peter Port, Guernsey
Bank of Scotland International; Lloyds Bank Commercial; Lloyds Bank Islands Commercial; Lloyds Bank Premier Banking; Lloyds Bank Private Banking	Lloyds Bank International Limited	St Helier, Jersey
Nedbank	Nedbank Private Wealth Limited	Douglas, Isle of Man
Standard Bank; Standard Bank Offshore	Standard Bank Isle of Man Limited	Douglas, Isle of Man
Isle of Man Bank; Coutts Crown Dependencies; NatWest International; NatWest; RBS International	The Royal Bank of Scotland International Limited	St. Helier, Jersey
Standard Bank	The Standard Bank of South Africa Limited	Johannesburg, South Africa

== See also ==
- List of banks in Europe
