= John Kelly (bailiff) =

Manx politician

- Preceded by: Robert Kelly
- Succeeded by: James Gell

Personal details
- Born: circa 1793 Isle of Man
- Died: 17 September 1854 (aged 60–61) Castletown, Isle of Man
- Profession: Advocate

John Kelly (c. 1793 – 17 September 1854) was a Manx advocate who became High Bailiff of Castletown and a Member of the House of Keys.

== Biography ==
Born and raised on the Isle of Man, John Kelly pursued a career in the legal profession following his schooling. He was appointed High Bailiff of Castletown by the Isle of Man's Lieutenant Governor, Cornelius Smelt, on August 17, 1832. As a magistrate Kelly was said to have been judicious, impartial and highly competent.

=== Death ===
John Kelly died at his home in Castletown, Isle of Man on Saturday September 17, 1854, following a short illness. Following Kelly's death he was succeeded as High Bailiff of Castletown by Sir James Gell.
