= William Cain (deemster) =

Manx judge (1935–2021)

Thomas William Cain CBE QC RBV TH (1 June 1935 – 30 April 2021) was a First Deemster of the Isle of Man.

== Early life ==
He was educated at Marlborough College and then Worcester College, Oxford. After performing his National Service from 1953 to 1955, he was called to the Bar at Gray's Inn in 1959 and admitted to the Manx bar in 1961, whence he worked for T W Cain and Sons, Advocates.

== Attorney-General ==
He served as Attorney General and Member of the Legislative Council of the Isle of Man from 1980 to 1993, when he became Second Deemster. He succeeded as First Deemster and Clerk of the Rolls in 1998, serving until 2002. Cain was appointed a CBE in 2003.

== Judiciary positions ==
- Attorney General, 1980-1993
- Second Deemster, 1993-1998
- First Deemster and Clerk of the Rolls, 1998-2002
