= Samuel Harris (bailiff) =

Manx advocate and philanthropist, High Bailiff of Douglas, Isle of Man

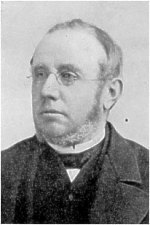
- Samuel Harris
- Monarch: Queen Victoria. King Edward VII
- Governor: Francis Pigott Stainsby Conant. Spencer Walpole. Joseph West Ridgeway

Personal details
- Born: 6 November 1815 Douglas, Isle of Man
- Died: 9 June 1905 (aged 89) Douglas, Isle of Man
- Party: Independent
- Spouse: Ann Bateman Craig (1839-1892, her death)
- Children: Margaret Harris. Georgina Maria Harris. Samuel Joseph Harris. Edward Craig Harris. Ann Harris. Charlotte Francis Harris. Thomas John Harris. Cecil Henry Harris.
- Profession: Advocate

Samuel Harris QC (6 November 1815 – 9 June 1905) was a Manx advocate, businessman and philanthropist who became High Bailiff of Douglas and a member of the Legislative Council of the Isle of Man. He was also a founder of the Isle of Man Bank and a director of the Isle of Man Steam Packet Company.

== Biography ==
=== Early life ===
Samuel Harris was born in Douglas, Isle of Man, the eldest of two sons to Samuel Harris; a linen draper and wine & spirit merchant of North Quay, Douglas, and Ann (née Holyland). He was educated at a private school run by the Reverend Samuel Haining.

=== Career ===
On completion of his schooling, Harris pursued a career in the legal profession. He was articled to the practice of High Bailiff James Quirk and on 24 March 1842, he was called to the Manx Bar. Harris then set up practice with Alfred Adams until in March 1864, Harris was appointed High Bailiff of Douglas, and the partnership with Adams was dissolved.

In 1846 Harris was appointed a Tithe Agent and would continue as such until his retirement, being replaced in that capacity by Ridgeway Harrison.

The first elections for Douglas Town Commissioners were held in 1860, with Harris topping the poll leading to his appointment as the first Chairman of the town's Commissioners and in such a role would represent Douglas at various functions. He played a major part in the development of the town and the upgrading of the town's amenities including the construction of the sewage system. At this time Harris constructed the Imperial Hotel at the Red Pier, on the site of the old courthouse and which would later become the headquarters of the Isle of Man Steam Packet Company. He also acquired a portion of land on the central foreshore of Douglas Bay, between St Thomas' Church and Broadway, bordering the Villa Marina Estate, which was developed into the town's first promenade and which would subsequently be named Harris Promenade.

In 1861 Harris was appointed Diocesan Registrar to the Bishop of Sodor and Man, Horatio Powys. In this capacity Harris became embroiled in the dispute between the Bishop and the Reverend Drury, Vicar of Braddan, concerning who was eligible in the appointment of the Vicar of St Thomas' Church, Douglas; a dispute which led to the church being closed for a number of years and which was only resolved following an expensive lawsuit.

In June 1865, Samuel Harris was appointed Registrar of Deeds and following the passing of the Companies Act 1865, he became Registrar of Joint Stock Companies. Harris, together with Henry Noble, William Moore and William Callister founded the Isle of Man Bank in October 1865; Harris becoming the bank's Chairman in 1872. One of the first undertakings of the bank was to purchase two fields on the slope of Douglas Head which in turn was presented to the people of Douglas as a recreational ground.

Following the death of the Vicar General of Sodor and Man, Richard Jebb, in 1884, the Bishop appointed Harris to the post, a position he would hold until 1903. In this position he was to become a judge of the Ecclesiastical Court and occupy a seat on the Isle of Man's Legislative Council. In his capacity as High Bailiff Harris acted as Returning Officer for school board and poor law elections.

=== Personal life ===
In 1839 Samuel Harris married Ann Craig. The marriage produced eight children, however two of their sons, Edward and Thomas, would die in infancy and in addition Harris was predeceased by a further three of his children and his wife, who died in 1892. A foremost citizen of Douglas, he was a tall commanding figure who was in constant demand as a speaker on formal (and informal) occasions. Blessed with a vivid memory, it was said that he could recall the coronation festivities in Douglas for King George IV, King William IV and Queen Victoria.

It was said of him that he always took a benevolent attitude to the poorer citizens of the Island, and was a trustee of various charitable bodies. He took a principal part in the founding of the House of Industry in Douglas, and it was a source of immense pride to him that he was instrumental in persuading Queen Victoria to become a subscriber to its upkeep, the queen contributing the sum of £25 annually. Another charitable cause to which he was associated was the hospital when it was situated in Fort Street, Douglas, the committee of which he was chairman for many years. In addition he was a generous subscriber to the Douglas Coal Fund and the Ladies Soup Dispensary. In 1897 he was also instrumental in raising money for the dependents of nineteen miners who lost their lives the Snaefell Mine Disaster.

Samuel Harris was appointed as a trustee to the estate of Henry Bloom Noble following the death of Noble in 1903, being in part responsible for the more than £250,000 which Noble had left to Manx charities in his will. He was also a trustee of the will of the recluse Peter Baume who also bequeathed the bulk of his estate to the Manx people.

Harris was offered the first Mayoralty of Douglas on the incorporation of the town in 1896 but turned it down, saying he had too many other commitments.

Whilst performing the opening of the new Douglas Market Hall in 1900, he suffered a mild stroke which in turn would lead him to withdrawing from the numerous positions he held including his resignation as High Bailiff, a position he had held for over 40 years, in the spring of 1905. He was also the chairman of the Trustees of the Douglas Grammar School, being succeeded by James Stowell Gell.

=== Death ===
Samuel Harris died at his home, Marathon, Victoria Road, Douglas, on the evening of 9 June 1905.

== Offices ==
- Tithe Agent
- High Bailiff
- Registrar of Deeds
- Diocesan Registrar
- Vicar General
- Chairman of Douglas Town Commissioners
- Chairman of Douglas Coal Fund
