= Andrew Corlett =

Manx judge

Andrew Thomas Kaneen Corlett is the current First Deemster and Clerk of the Rolls of the Isle of Man who served as Second Deemster from 2011 to 2018, having previously held the title of Deputy Deemster from 2007. His appointment as First Deemster & Clerk of the Rolls was announced on 10 July 2018.

Corlett was a litigation director with the Douglas law firm Simcocks since 2001. He specialised in public law, human rights and employment law and was previously a Government Advocate from 1995 to 2001, and a partner with Dickinson Cruickshank.

Corlett was educated at King William's College on the island. He went up to Pembroke College, Oxford in 1978, and graduated in law from the University of Oxford. He was called to the English and Manx Bars in 1984.
