= Bruce MacPherson (judge) =

Manx judge

Bruce Whyte MacPherson MLC (18 January 1891 - 31 October 1971) was a Second Deemster in the Isle of Man.

MacPherson was born in Liverpool in 1891 and became a captain in 4 Battalion, King's Liverpool Regiment and served in the Cameroons, 1914–15. He was promoted to major in 1935. As an advocate he joined the Manx Bar in 1936. He was Second Deemster and a member of the Legislative Council 1958 to 1963. He was the last Second Deemster to sit in the Legislative Council ex officio before the 1965 Act removed the right.

The following was said about his capacity as a Judge:

During his five years in office he upheld the dignity of the Bench to the entire satisfaction of his colleagues on the Bench and at the Bar. He was painstaking, patient, firm and kindly. He sat in the Court of General Gaol and his sentences for criminal offences were always fair. He always regarded the crime of breaking and entering private property as particularly serious, and believed that the public were entitled to the privacy of their own homes and that any invasion of this privacy should be severely punished.

— Unknown, Unknown

MacPherson was also a leading authority on genealogy and heraldry. He was also Vice President of the Royal British Legion and Captain of the Parish of Santon from 1964.

MacPherson's son, Michael MacPherson, volunteered to serve in the Manx Regiment in 1940 and fought in North Africa alongside the British Indian Army.
