= Mark Quayle (advocate, b. 1770) =

Mark Hildesley Quayle

Clerk of the Rolls
- In office 1797–1804
- Monarch: King George III
- Governor: John Murray, 4th Duke of Atholl,
- Preceded by: John Quayle
- Succeeded by: Thomas Stowell

Personal details
- Born: 1770 Isle of Man
- Died: July 1804 (aged 33–34) Castletown, Isle of Man
- Party: Independent
- Spouse: Mary Wilson
- Children: Mark Hildesley Quayle
- Profession: Advocate

Mark Hildesley Quayle, KC (1770 – July 1804) was a Manx lawyer who became the Clerk of the Rolls on the Isle of Man at the early age of 27.

== Biography ==
Mark Hildesley Quayle was named after his godfather, Bishop Mark Hildesley, who served as the Bishop of Sodor and Man (1755–1772). He was one of eight children of his parents, John Quayle and Mary Quayle (née Wilson), being the youngest of the five sons. His father had served as Clerk of the Rolls from 1755 to 1797. His grandfather, also named John Quayle, had held the office from 1736 to 1755, thereby making Quayle the third son in a direct line to have held the position. As Clerk of the Rolls his duties were to keep the public records of the Island, and to take evidence in special cases heard before the Manx Chancery Court.

He married Mary Wilson in 1837; the marriage produced one child (Mark Hildesley Quayle), who followed his father into the legal profession and became Clerk of the Rolls in 1847.

=== Death ===
Mark Quayle died a month before the birth of his son, in July 1804.

== Offices of State ==
- Clerk of the Rolls, 1797–1804

== See also ==
- Mark Quayle (advocate, b. 1804)
- Mark Quayle (advocate, b. 1841)
