= John Quayle (judge, born 1725) =

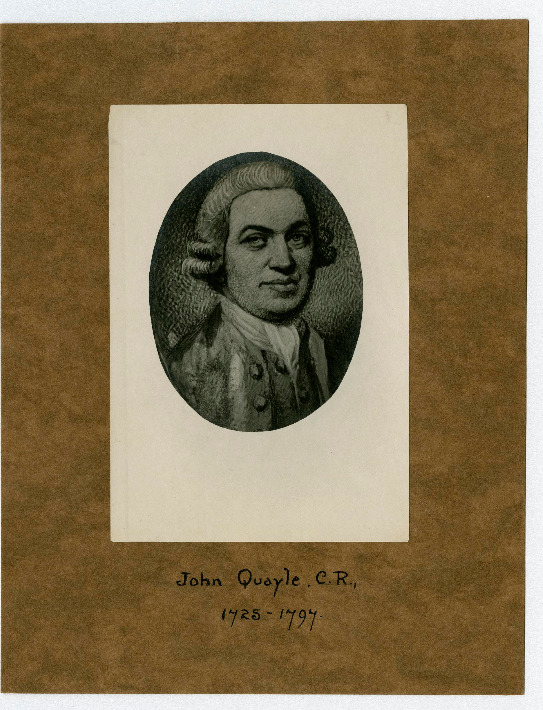

Clerk of the Rolls
- In office 1755–1797
- Monarchs: King George II, King George III,
- Governor: James Murray, 2nd Duke of Atholl, Henry Hope, Richard Dawson
- Preceded by: John Quayle
- Succeeded by: Mark Quayle

Personal details
- Born: 1725 Isle of Man
- Died: 1797 (aged 71–72) Isle of Man
- Spouse: Margaret Moore
- Children: George Quayle; Thomas Quayle; Edward Quayle; Basil Quayle; John Quayle; Mark Hildesley Quayle; Sarah Quayle, Katherine Elizabeth Quayle
- Profession: Advocate

John Quayle, (1725–1797) was a Manx lawyer who became the Clerk of the Rolls in the Isle of Man.

== Biography ==
John Quayle was born in the Isle of Man in 1725, the son of John Quayle and Elizabeth (née Harrison). He married Margaret Moore, daughter of Sir George Moore in 1750: the marriage produced eight children.

Part of a Manx legal dynasty, Quayle became Clerk of the Rolls in 1755 following the death of his father. His duties including the keeping of the public records of the Island, and taking evidence in special cases heard before the Manx Chancery Court. Quayle was offered a knighthood in 1781, however he declined the offer.

John Quayle died in 1797. He was succeeded as Clerk of the Rolls by his son, Mark Quayle
