= Stephen Harding (barrister) =

Lawyer in the Isle of Man

- Occupation: Barrister

Stephen Mark Harding QC, LL.B was Her Majesty's Attorney General for the Isle of Man and ex officio Member of the Legislative Council from 2011 to 2016.

He was suspended from this role and charged with perjury.

The jury in his first trial failed to reach a verdict. A retrial was pursued, however the jury again failed to reach a verdict. No further proceedings were taken.

He retired in 2016, citing ill-health as a result of the ‘strain’ of the proceedings.
