= William Callister =

Manx politician

William Callister MHK (1808–1872) was a Manx timber importer from Ramsey who became a Member of the House of Keys. He was an issuer of a halfpenny trader's currency token in 1831. In October 1865, Callister, together with Samuel Harris, William Moore and Henry Noble founded the Isle of Man Bank.

== See also ==
- Traders' Currency Tokens of the Isle of Man
