= John McHutchin =

Manx judge

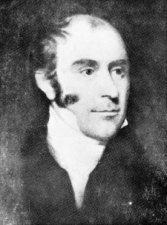
- John McHutchin

Deemster and Clerk of the Rolls
- Monarchs: George III; George IV; William IV; Victoria
- Governor: Cornelius Smelt; Charles Hope
- Preceded by: Thomas Stowell
- Succeeded by: Mark Hildesley Quayle

Personal details
- Born: 1787 Peel, Isle of Man
- Died: 14 March 1847 (aged 59–60) Castletown, Isle of Man
- Spouse: Sabrina Rann (1811 - 1847, her death)
- Profession: Advocate

John McHutchin (1787 – 14 March 1847) was a Manx lawyer who successively became High Bailiff of Douglas, Second Deemster and Clerk of the Rolls in the Isle of Man.

== Biography ==
=== Early life ===
John McHutchin was born in Peel, Isle of Man; his year of birth is not precisely known. In the Manx Notebook it is given as 1788, but his obituary in the Isle of Man Times of 20 March 1847 lists the year as 1787. His father, Gilbert McHutchin, came from Scotland and arrived on the Isle of Man around 1785 (although again this is subject to conjecture). Initially taking employment as an agent for Sir George Moore, Speaker of the House of Keys, McHutchin's father held the post of Constable of Peel for many years. His mother, Catherine Dawson, came from a Manx family; McHutchin's parents married in 1785.

The marriage of Gilbert McHutchin and Catherine Dawson produced four children: two sons and two daughters. McHutchin's younger sister, Margaret, married John Gell and was the mother of Sir James Gell. His brother, Gilbert, also became and advocate working at the Rolls Office where the young James Gell was articled.

Although not from a wealthy background, McHutchin received the rudiments of his education as a free scholar at Peel Grammar School and then from the Reverend Joseph Stowell and John Stowell, brothers of Thomas Stowell. McHutchin was subsequently articled to Thomas Stowell who was appointed Clerk of the Rolls in 1804 following the death of Mark Hidesley Quayle.

=== Professional career ===
In 1808 McHutchin was admitted to the Manx Bar and was a successful lawyer. His ability in his chosen field had already been noticed when, at the age of 20, he was appointed Secretary to the Lieutenant Governor of the Isle of Man, Cornelius Smelt, prior to the completion of his studies. The position was one which he held for two years.

In 1810 McHutchin was appointed to the Seneschal's Office in Douglas, and following the appointment as Second Deemster of Thomas Gawne in 1816, McHutchin was appointed High Bailiff of Douglas under the patronage of the Duke of Athol, the appointment being made with a view to using him judicially with regard to the green crop tithe question. On the death of Deemster Norris Moore in 1819 McHutchin was appointed Deemster to the northern district and in 1821, on the death of Thomas Stowell, he was made the Clerk of the Rolls at the unusually early age of 34.

=== Personal life ===
In 1811 McHutchin married Sabrina Rann (1792 - 1847). His wife's family came originally from Warwickshire before taking residence at the estate of Shenvallay, Malew. She was the daughter of Colonel James Rann, a retired military officer late of the Royal Birmingham Fencible Infantry, who had spent the majority of his wealth (£8,000) in raising and equipping a regiment for the defence of the Crown during the American War of Independence and Napoleonic Wars.

The marriage produced twelve children (eight sons and four daughters). Three of his sons died during his lifetime.

McHutchin was highly regarded by his peers; he rose from a modest rank in life to the heights of the judiciary by his own efforts and application. He was opposed to the reform of the Isle of Man's system of government, and particularly to democratic elections for the House of Keys, a position he held until his death.

=== Death ===
In the winter of 1846-47 HcHutchin's health began to decline, and this was hastened by the death of his wife on 10 February. He died at his home in Castletown, aged 59 on 14 March 1847; just over a month after the death of his wife.

Following his funeral service McHutchin's body was interred with that of his wife and pre-deceased children at the Parish Church of Malew.

== Offices of State ==
- Clerk of the Rolls, 1821-1847
- Second Deemster, 1820-1821
- High Bailiff of Douglas, 1816-1819
