= Bruce MacPherson (field hockey) =

Canadian field hockey player (born 1958)

Bruce Macpherson (born May 19, 1958 in Pembury, United Kingdom) is a former field hockey player from Canada.

Macpherson participated in the 1984 Summer Olympics in Los Angeles. There he finished in tenth place with the Men's National Team.

== International senior competitions ==
- 1984 – Olympic Games, Los Angeles (10th)
