= John Christian (Deemster) =

Manx judge

John Christian JP (12 July 1776 – 27 February 1852) was a First Deemster of the Isle of Man.

Christian was born in Castletown in 1776. He was educated at Eton and St. John's College, Cambridge, where he graduated B.A. as 8th Wrangler in 1798 and graduated MA in 1801. Admitted to Lincoln's Inn on 23 January 1798, he was registered as a Barrister-at-Law in 1803. He then lived in Somerset and was a JP for that region. He was married in 1807. In 1823 Christian was appointed First Deemster and moved back to the Island, living in Douglas at Fort Anne. His son was the Rev.William Bell Christian the last self-elected Member of the House of Keys and first elected member for Ramsey. Christian died in 1852 at his ancestral home in Lezayre.
