= Michael Moyle (magistrate) =

His Worship Michael Moyle was the High Bailiff of the Isle of Man beginning in 2002. He was the head stipendiary magistrate until he retired on 30 January 2010.
