= Staff of Government Division =

Government Division of High Court

The Staff of Government Division of the High Court of Justice (usually shortened to Staff of Government Division) is the Court of Appeal in the Isle of Man. It hears all appeals, both criminal and civil, from the High Court. It is the second highest court in the Isle of Man with final appeal going to the Judicial Committee of the Privy Council acting as 'The King in Council'.

The judges of the Staff of Government Division are the First Deemster and Clerk of the Rolls, the Second Deemster, the Judge of Appeal and any other English King's Counsel who are appointed as acting deemsters to hear an appeal.

== Name and history ==
The name Staff of Government comes from the original court of appeal on the Island, which consisted of the officers of the Lord of Mann, and later the officers of the Lieutenant Governor. The Judicature Act 1883 created the High Court of Justice, and replaced the Lieutenant Governor's officers with the two deemsters who acted as judges in the courts of first instance, and the Clerk of the Rolls.

However, this left the Lieutenant Governor continuing to act as judge despite lacking any legal training. He was removed by the Judicature (Amendment) Act 1921, following the addition of an additional independent judge, in the form of an English Queen's Counsel as Judge of Appeal, by the Judicature (Amendment) Act 1918. This removed the last vestiges of the government and its staff from the Manx judicial system.
