= High Bailiff =

The High Bailiff (Manx: Ard-Vaylee) is a legal position held within the Isle of Man. The High Bailiff is the head stipendiary magistrate.

The current High Bailiff is Her Worship Jayne Hughes, who took office on 11 March 2019.

The High Bailiff and their deputy are appointed by the Lieutenant Governor. The High Bailiff and Deputy High Bailiff are ex officio judicial officers of the High Court of Justice of the Isle of Man and coroners of inquests.

Originally there was a High Bailiff of each of the four towns of the island: Castletown, Ramsey, Peel and Douglas. In 1911 the offices of High Bailiff of Castletown and Douglas, and the offices of High Bailiff of Peel and Ramsey, were merged. Those offices were merged in turn in 1933 to form a single office of High Bailiff of the Isle of Man.

Lists of High Bailiffs
Castletown	Douglas	Peel	Ramsey
William Callow, 1777-?; Robert Kelly, 1811–?; John Kelly, 1832–1854; James Gell, 1854–1865; John Moore Jeffcott, 1865–1892; James Stowell Gell, 1892–1911	John Cosnahan, 1777–1808; Norris Moore, 1808–1816; John McHutchin, 1816–1819; James Quirk, 1820–1841; John Courtney Bluett, ?-1855; Senhouse Wilson, 1855–1864; Samuel Harris, 1864–1905; James Stowell Gell, 1905–1911	Robert Farrant, 1777–1794; Captain George Savage, 1794–1802; Thomas Clark, 1802–1807; Hugh Clucas, 1808–1817; James Quirk, 1817–1820; John Llewellyn, 1820–1840; Richard Harrison, 1840–1853; Robert John Moore, 1853–1884; A.N. Laughton, 1884–1911	John Frissell Crellin, 1777–1794; James Wilks, 1794–1805; Thomas Gawne, 1805–1812; Ewan Gill, 1812–1821; Thomas Arthur Corlett, 1821–1828; John Caesar Gelling, 1828–1832; Frederick Tellett, 1832–1873; Sir Alured Dumbell, 1873–1880; John Corlet LaMothe, 1880–1898; James Murray Cruikshank, 1898–1911
Douglas and Castletown		Ramsey and Peel	
James Stowell Gell, 1911–1918; Reginald Douglas Farrant, 1919–1925; William Lay, 1925–1933		James Murray Cruikshank, 1911–1916; F. M. LaMothe, 1916–1921; William Lay, 1921–1925; William Percy Cowley, 1925–1933	
Isle of Man
William Lay, 1933–1937; Henry Percy Kelly, 1937–1938; Ramsey Gelling Johnson, 1938–1947; Howard Deighton Lay, 1947–1961; Robert Kinley Eason, 1961–1969; Henry Callow, 1969–1988; Weldon Williams, 1988–1995; Andrew Williamson, 1995–2002; Michael Moyle, 2002–2010; John Needham, 2010; Jayne Hughes, 2019

== Deputy High Bailiffs ==
- Unknown, 1933–1977
- Weldon Williams, 1977–1988
- Andrew Williamson, 1988–1995
- Michael Moyle, 1995–2002
- Alastair Montgomerie, 2002–2011
- Jayne Hughes, 2011
- Christopher Arrowsmith, 2019
- James Brooks, 2021

== See also ==
- Bailiff
- Bailiff (Channel Islands)
- Manx Judiciary
