= Henry Callow =

Manx judge

Henry Callow CBE (died 14 April 2006) was a Second Deemster in the Isle of Man.

He began his career as a Manx advocate and was then appointed High Bailiff in 1969. After 19 years in the post, he was made Second Deemster until retiring in 1993. He was the Provincial Grand Master of the Isle of Man Freemasons from 1983 to 1994. He was appointed CBE in the 1994 Birthday Honours.

He is the most recent judge in the British Isles to pass a death sentence (upon Anthony Teare in 1992), although it was commuted to life imprisonment. Capital punishment in the Isle of Man was formally abolished by Tynwald in 1993.
