= Mark Quayle (advocate, b. 1804) =

Mark Quayle QC

Clerk of the Rolls
- Monarch: Victoria
- Governor: Hope, Conant
- Preceded by: John McHutchin
- Succeeded by: Alfred Walter Adams

Personal details
- Born: Mark Hildesley Quayle; August 1804 Isle of Man
- Died: 19 March 1879 (aged 74) Castletown, Isle of Man
- Party: Independent
- Spouse: Mary Jane Hamilton Spedding
- Profession: Advocate

Mark Hildesley Quayle, QC (August 1804 – 19 March 1879) was a Manx lawyer, antiquarian and philanthropist who became the Clerk of the Rolls of the Isle of Man and a Member of the House of Keys.

== Biography ==
=== Career ===
Quayle was the only son of his father, who had died a month before his birth and who was of the same name, and had been Clerk of the Rolls from 1797 to 1804. His great-grandfather and grandfather, both named John Quayle, had also held the office from 1736 to 1755 and from 1755 to 1797 respectively, thereby making Quayle the fourth son in a direct line to have held the position.

Mark Quayle was admitted to the Manx Bar on 5 July 1825 and succeeded John McHutchin as Clerk of the Rolls on 13 April 1847, an office he held for almost 32 years. On two occasions during vacancies in the Governorship, Quayle was appointed Deputy Governor of the Isle of Man.

As Clerk of the Rolls his duties were to keep the public records of the Island, and to take evidence in special cases heard before the Manx Chancery Court. As an additional appointment as a consequence of his capacity as Clerk of the Rolls, Quayle became the Equity Judge of the Island.

On 5 July 1837 Quayle was elected as a Member of the House of Keys (MHK) to fill the vacancy caused by the death of Capt. John Anderson. In September 1860, upon the resignation of Governor Hope, Quayle was appointed Deputy Governor, a position he held until the appointment of Governor Pigott. On 31 January 1873 he was elected Chairman of the Justices and he at one time acted as Assistant Deemster during the illness of Deemster Stephen.

It was said of him that he was an upright judge and a patriotic member of the Legislature.

=== Personal life ===
Mark Quayle married Mary Spedding in 1837. Of their children, John Quayle and Mark Hildesley Quayle also became advocates, with John Quayle also becoming a MHK. Daniel Quayle was ordained into the priesthood and James Quayle took a commission in the Army. He acquired land at The Crogga, in the parish of Santan, which was developed into the family home, but he did not live to see its completion.

=== Death and funeral ===
Over the winter of 1878–79 Quayle's health began to decline, resulting in a mild attack of paralysis. On 18 March he suffered a severe attack and he died on the morning of 19 March at his home, Bridge House, Castletown, Isle of Man, adjoining what is now the Nautical Museum. Mark Hildesley Quayle's funeral was on Monday 24 March 1879. The procession left Bridge House at 12 o'clock and made its way to the Parish Church of Malew where the service took place; his body was then interred in the family vault.

== Offices of State ==
- Clerk of the Rolls, 1847–1879
