= John Needham (Manx Judiciary) =

High Bailiff and Judicial Officer of the Isle of Man

John Needham was the High Bailiff and Judicial Officer of the Isle of Man until his appointment as Second Deemster. He was appointed in 2010. Prior to his appointment he was the Clerk to the Isle of Man Magistrates.

Needham was appointed as Second Deemster on 29 November 2018.
