= Denis Gerrard =

British lawyer and judge

Sir Albert Denis Gerrard (27 May 1903 – 23 January 1965) was a British lawyer and High Court judge, who sat in the Queen's Bench Division between 1953 and 1956.

== Biography ==
The younger son of Samuel and Ruth Gerrard, Southport, Denis Gerrard was educated at Merchant Taylors’ School, Crosby and Gonville and Caius College, Cambridge (BA, LLB). He was called to the Bar by Gray’s Inn in 1927. He joined the Northern Circuit, of which he eventually became the leader. He was made a King's Counsel in 1945 and elected a bencher of Gray's Inn in 1948. He was the Recorder of Salford from 1945 to 1948, Judge of the Salford Hundred Court of Record from 1948 to 1953, and Judge of Appeal of the Isle of Man from 1950 to 1953.

Gerrard was appointed a Justice of the High Court in 1953, receiving the customary knighthood. Assigned to the Queen's Bench Division, he resigned from the bench in 1956 due to ill health. He later became Treasurer of Gray’s Inn for 1964 and Vice-Treasurer for 1965.

Gerrard married Hilda Goodwin Jones in 1927; they had one son.

== Arms ==
Coat of arms of Denis Gerrard

Notes
Displayed in a painting at Gray's Inn.
Crest
In front of two books chevronwise Argent bound Gules garnished Or a lyre also Or between two garden roses Gules slipped and leaved Proper.
Escutcheon
Azure a chevron between in chief two pairs of outside callipers Argent and in base a lion rampant Ermine ducally crowned Or.
Motto
Arte Et Animo
