= John Quayle (advocate, b. 1693) =

Manx lawyer

Clerk of the Rolls
- In office 1736–1755
- Monarchs: King George I, King George II
- Governor: James Murray, 2nd Duke of Atholl,
- Succeeded by: John Quayle

Personal details
- Born: 1693 Isle of Man
- Died: 1755 (aged 61–62) Isle of Man
- Spouse: Elizabeth Harrison
- Children: Marharet Quayle, William Quayle, Elizabeth Quayle, John Quayle, Christiana Quayle
- Profession: Advocate

John Quayle, KC (1693–1755) was a Manx lawyer who became the Clerk of the Rolls in the Isle of Man.

== Biography ==
John Quayle was born in the Isle of Man in 1693, the son of Hugh Quayle. He married Elizabeth Harrison in 1717: the marriage produced five children. He became Clerk of the Rolls in 1736, his duties including the keeping of the public records of the Island, and taking evidence in special cases heard before the Manx Chancery Court.

John Quayle died in 1755, the cause of death being a fall from his horse. His body was buried at St Mary's Chapel, Castletown, Isle of Man.
