= Geoffrey Tattersall =

British judge (1947–2025)

His Honour Geoffrey Tattersall KC

Judge of Appeal Isle of Man
- Preceded by: Benet Hytner
- Succeeded by: Jeremy Storey

Personal details
- Born: Geoffrey Frank Tattersall; 22 September 1947
- Died: 5 January 2025 (aged 77)
- Education: Manchester Grammar School
- Alma mater: Christ Church, Oxford
- Profession: Barrister

Geoffrey Frank Tattersall (22 September 1947 – 5 January 2025) was a British barrister and Judge of Appeal in the Isle of Man.

== Life and career ==
Geoffrey Frank Tattersall was born on 22 September 1947 in Ashton-under-Lyne, Lancashire, England. He was educated at Manchester Grammar School from 1958 to 1966. He studied jurisprudence at Christ Church, Oxford and was called to the bar at Lincoln's Inn in 1970.

He was appointed a Queen's Counsel (QC) in 1992. He was the Judge of Appeal for the Isle of Man from 1997 to 2017, and a Deputy High Court Judge in England since 2003. As a barrister, he was a member of the Byrom Street Chambers, Manchester from 1992, and 22 Old Buildings, London.

Tattersall was a member of the General Synod of the Church of England from 1995 until 2025. He was Diocesan Chancellor of the Diocese of Carlisle from 2003 and also of the Diocese of Manchester from 2004. He was the Vicar General of the Diocese of Sodor and Man from 2015 to 2019. He supported the introduction of church blessings for same-sex relationships but not same-sex weddings: "I cannot see how we cannot allow the relationships of those who are LGBTI+ to be blessed in Church although I have doubts as to whether the Church could recognise their relationships as married".

Tattersall died on 5 January 2025, aged 77.
