= William Drinkwater =

Manx judge

Sir William Leece Drinkwater (28 March 1812 – 22 May 1909) was a First Deemster of the Isle of Man.

Drinkwater came from an old Liverpool family and was born on 28 March 1812. His grandfather was James Drinkwater, Mayor of Liverpool in 1810 who married Elinor Leece, of Ballamona, Braddan.

The long European peace, which followed the Battle of Waterloo, resulted in many English children being sent to France for education, among them William Leece Drinkwater, who attended Angoulëme College and became fluent in French. He then attended the Royal Institution School in Liverpool and then St John's College, Cambridge. He graduated with a BA degree in 1834 and later took an MA degree.

He was called to the English Bar (Inner Temple) in 1837 and subsequently practised in the Northern circuit acting as a reporting barrister in the Common Pleas Division.

Ten years later Drinkwater was appointed Second Deemster of the Isle of Man, and eight years later First Deemster. As a judge his record was one of which any man would have had good reason to be proud. His profound knowledge of both English and Manx law, his common sense and his impeccable impartiality made him almost the perfect judge.

His position as Deemster entitled him to a seat in the Legislative Council and his record as a member of the Legislature was as distinguished as that of his career as a judge. In politics he was a conservative. He was also very independent and this independence often brought him into conflict with Sir Henry Loch, who was very autocratic in his methods and ruled Legislative Council with a rod of iron. Drinkwater was the only member of the Council willing to put up a fight and seldom came off second best. Despite their frequent bickerings in the Council and Tynwald Court, Loch and Drinkwater were friends in private life.

In 1877, on the recommendation of Lieutenant Governor Sir Henry Loch, he was knighted.

In the autumn of 1897 he resigned his Deemstership and retired from public life. After retiring from the bench and Legislature, Drinkwater continued to take a great interest in the Isle of Man Hospital being Chairman of the Committee. He had married his first cousin, Elenor Drinkwater Bourne (1818-1897), in 1841. He died on 22 May 1909 and his funeral was a private affair with only seven family members present: at the time of his death he had one surviving child, George Leece Drinkwater (1852-1930).

Sir William Leece Drinkwater was a descendant of the ancient family of Drinkwater, of Bent, in Chesire. According to Burke's Landed Gentry, the Drinkwater's Crest is 'Three wheat ears, two in saltire, one in pale or, encircled by a ducal coronet ppr.'

== Offices of State ==
- First Deemster, 1855–1897
- Second Deemster, 1847–1855
