= High Court of Justice (Isle of Man) =

The High Court of Justice of the Isle of Man is governed by the High Court Act 1991. There are four permanent judges of the High Court:

- the First Deemster and Clerk of the Rolls
- the Second Deemster
- a full-time additional deemster
- the Judge of Appeal

The First Deemster is President of the High Court and has responsibility for the distribution of the work of the High Court. The Judge of Appeal, a part-time appointment, can only sit in the Appeal Division. Unless the parties otherwise consent, the quorum of the Appeal Division is at least two judges of the High Court. A deemster may not sit on an appeal from his own judgment or order. At present, there is a panel of acting deemsters, who may be called upon to assist in the discharge of the business of the High Court.

== History ==
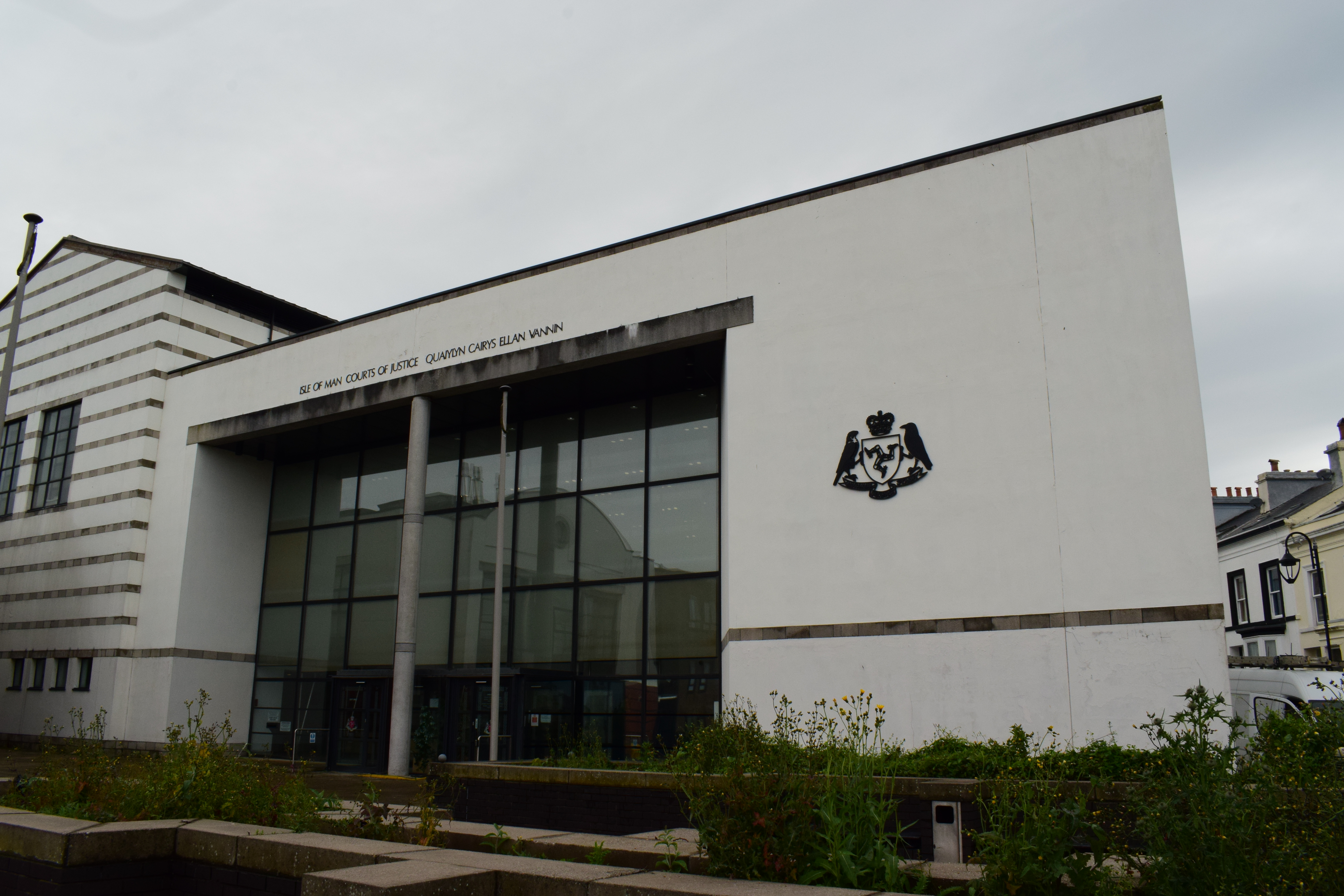
The Isle of Man Courts of Justice building at Albert Street, Douglas

The High Court of Justice of the Isle of Man came into existence on 1 January 1884. It merged the former Courts of Chancery, Court of Exchequer, Court of the Staff of Government, Court of Common Law and Court of Admiralty and the Deemster’s Courts. Its judges were the Lieutenant Governor, the Clerk of the Rolls and the two deemsters. It consisted of a Chancery Division and Common Law Division with original jurisdiction, and a Staff of Government Division with appellate jurisdiction. The former summary jurisdiction of the Deemsters in contract, debt etc. was to be exercised by the Common Law Division.

The jurisdiction of the ecclesiastical courts relating to probate, administration of estates and matrimonial causes was vested in the High Court on 5 July 1884. (The court had no power to dissolve a marriage until 1938, when judicial divorce was first introduced in the Isle of Man)

The offices of First Deemster and Clerk of the Rolls were merged in 1918, and provision was made for the appointment of an English King’s Counsel as a standing Judge of Appeal, to sit with one Deemster to hear appeals from the other Deemster. The Governor ceased to be a judge of the court in 1921.

The jurisdiction of the Court of Criminal Appeal, which was set up in 1921, was transferred to the Staff of Government Division of the High Court on 1 December 1969.

From 1991 the jurisdiction of the court in family matters was to be exercised by a new Family Division. A new office of Deputy Deemster was created in 2002 but abolished in 2009 (see below).

With effect from 1 September 2009 the constitution of the High Court was changed. There are now two tiers of judges:—

- Deemsters, i.e. the First Deemster and Clerk of the Rolls, the Second Deemster and the Judge of Appeal, together with any additional deemsters, full-time or part-time, who may be appointed. At present, there is one full-time additional deemster (who previously held the office of Deputy Deemster), and additional part-time deemsters (previously called 'acting deemsters') are appointed from time to time to hear a particular case.
- Judicial officers: the High Bailiff and Deputy High Bailiff, who are stipendiary magistrates, are judicial officers ex officio, together with any additional judicial officers, full-time or part-time, who may be appointed. At present, there is no full-time additional judicial officer, but additional part-time judicial officers are appointed from time to time to hear a particular case.

At the same time the separate Chancery, Common Law and Family Divisions were merged into a single Civil Division, and the procedure of the court was reformed on similar lines to the English Civil Procedure Rules 1998.

== Court of General Gaol Delivery ==
All serious crimes in the Isle of Man are tried in the Court of General Gaol Delivery. The Second Deemster normally sits as the judge. This court is not formally part of the High Court, but is administered as though it were part of the High Court. The court deals with all criminal matters where defendants have been committed for trial or sentence by a court of summary jurisdiction. Juries are normally composed of seven persons (unlike the usual twelve in England or fifteen in Scotland). The equivalent court in England and Wales is the Crown Court.

In 1992 the last-ever death sentence in any court in the British Isles was pronounced by Deemster Callow upon Anthony Teare for murder (although a sentence of life imprisonment was subsequently imposed following a retrial).

== See also ==
- Judiciary of the Isle of Man
