= Attorney General (Isle of Man) =

Head legal advisor in the Isle of Man government

Attorney General of the Isle of Man
- First holder: John Quillin

The Attorney General (Manx: Yn Turneyr Theayagh or Yn Ard-Turneyr) of the Isle of Man is the government's senior legal adviser and has an ex officio (non-voting) seat in the Legislative Council and in Tynwald Court.

The Attorney General is a Crown officer, rather than a member of the Isle of Man Government. He is appointed by the monarch on the advice of the UK Secretary of State for Justice.

Walter Wannenburgh was appointed to the office in October 2022 following the death in January 2022 of John Quinn QC, who first held the post in an acting capacity until 2017, while Stephen Harding was suspended and after Harding resigned. Harding was charged with perjury and committing acts against public justice, but after two trials in which the juries were unable to agree a verdict, it was announced that no further criminal proceedings would be taken.

== List of attorneys general ==
- John Quillin, 1765–1768
- Charles Searle, 1768–1774
- Sir Wadsworth Busk, 1774–1797
- William Frankland, 1797–1816
- James Clarke, 1816–1844
- Charles Richard Ogden, 1844–1866
- Sir James Gell CVO KC , 1866–1898
- George Alfred Ring, 1898–1921
- Ramsey Bignall Moore, 1921–1945
- Sydney James Kneale, 1945–1957
- George Edgar Moore, 1957–1963
- David Deighton Lay, 1963–1972
- Arthur Christian Luft CBE, 1972–1974
- John William Corrin CBE, 1974–1980
- Thomas William Cain QC, 1980–1993
- Michael Kerruish QC, 1993–1998
- John Corlett QC, 1998–2011
- Stephen Harding QC, 2011–2012
- John Quinn QC,
  - acting, 2013–2017
  - substantive, 2017–2022
- Walter Wannenburgh KC, 2022-

== See also ==
- Justice ministry
- Politics of Isle of Man
