= James Gell (Clerk of the Rolls) =

Manx lawyer and judge

Sir James Gell CVO KC
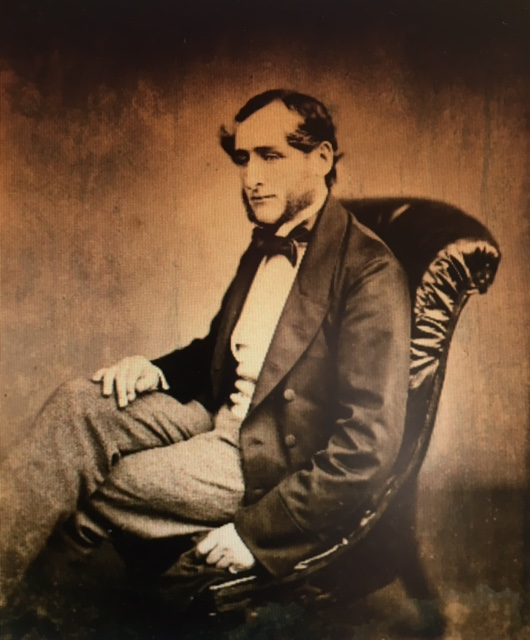
- Sir James Gell

First Deemster and Clerk of the Rolls
- Monarchs: Victoria, Edward VII
- Governor: John Henniker-Major, 5th Baron Henniker
- Preceded by: John Kelly
- Succeeded by: John Jeffcott

Personal details
- Born: 13 January 1823 Isle of Man
- Died: 12 March 1905 (aged 82) Castletown, Isle of Man
- Party: Independent
- Spouse: Amelia Marcia Gill (1850-1899)
- Children: John Gell. Hugh Gell. James Stowell Gell. William Gell Amelia Gell. Amy Gell.
- Profession: Advocate

Sir James Gell, CVO, KC (13 January 1823 – 12 March 1905) was a Manx lawyer, who was the First Deemster and Clerk of the Rolls in the Isle of Man. He was also the first Manxman to become Attorney General of the Isle of Man.

== Biography ==
=== Early life ===
James Gell was born on 13 January 1823, the son of John Gell, of Kenna, in the parish of German, Isle of Man and Margaret (née McHutchin) of Peel, Isle of Man. He was the second of three children, his brothers being John Gell (Jnr) and Captain Phillip Gell (1827–1898).

Gell was educated at King William's College, Castletown, Isle of Man.

=== Career ===
Following his schooling, Gell was articled to Gilbert McHutchin (his uncle) at the Rolls Office. In 1845 he was called to the Manx Bar.

After completing his articles Gell set up his own legal practice, becoming a highly sought-after advocate.

His first official appointment was as High Bailiff of Castletown upon the death of John Kelly; he held this office from 1854 to 1866. In 1866 the office of Attorney General became vacant following the retirement of Charles Ogden. Until the appointment of Gell, this office had always been held by an English lawyer, but at this juncture Governor Loch made determined efforts to secure the appointment of a Manxman, and made strong representations to the Home Office as to the advisability of appointing a Manx lawyer. Gell was eventually appointed; he was the first Manxman selected for the office.

From 1872 to 1881 he was chairman of the island's Board of Education. In 1887 he was knighted by Queen Victoria, along with William Drinkwater. In 1895 Sir James Gell was elected as a Church Commissioner.

After holding the office of Attorney General for 32 years, he was appointed First Deemster in 1898 upon the retirement of Sir William Drinkwater; and in 1900 he succeeded Sir Alured Dumbell as Clerk of the Rolls.

On two separate occasions Sir James held the highest office open to a Manxman, that of Governor of the Isle of Man. The first instance was during the illness of Lord Henniker: Sir James was appointed Deputy and presided at Tynwald. The second instance was in the second half of 1902, during the interregnum between the death of Lord Henniker in June and the arrival of the new lieutenant governor Lord Raglan. The latter did not take up the position until early 1903, due to illness.

During the second period Sir James welcomed King Edward VII and Queen Alexandra to the island during their visit in August 1902, an occasion on which Sir James was appointed a Commander of the Royal Victorian Order (CVO) by King Edward. Sir James was also present at the Coronation ceremony of King Edward VII.

Whilst Sir James was appointed Deputy Governor in the first place, he was appointed Acting Governor in the second instance, an important distinction. The Duke of Athol was the last supreme Governor of Man, until the Isle of Man Purchase Act 1765 (also known as the Act of Revestment). All Governors since then had been Lieutenant Governors, but Sir James' appointment as Acting Governor was on a par with the position of the Duke of Athol, and he had the right to appoint a Lieutenant Governor had he so wished. Thus his office of Acting Governor carried with it greater authority than that of Lieutenant Governor; this fact Sir James himself pointed out to the Home Office.

Other offices held by Sir James included: Chairman of the Insular Magistrates (to which office he succeeded in 1872 upon the death of William Callister), President of the Manx Law Society and Trustee of King William's College.

"It was said of Sir James that as a lawyer he was said to have an unequalled knowledge of Manx law in all its intricacies. In addition he was a very thorough ecclesiastical lawyer and as a judge he presided over some of the most important cases concerning the Isle of Man in the early 20th century, not least of which was the Dumbell's Bank Scandal".

Amongst his earlier cases he had experience as an advocate in the Bank of Mona failure and he was at one time standing counsel for the Isle of Man Railway Company and the Isle of Man Steam Packet Company. He was also engaged as an advocate in several murder trials.

Although a communicant of the Established Church, Sir James was renowned for his attitude to the Nonconformist conscience. A notable instance of this is when he introduced the Burial Act, which granted new privileges to Nonconformists; also an Act amending the law as to marriages in Nonconformist places of worship.

He took an interest in legal publications, and was editor of Statute Laws of the Isle of Man, 1836–1848, and of the revised edition of 1895. He edited Vol. 1 of Deemster Parr's Abstract Law of the Isle of Man; and also compiled a memorandum on the Tithe Question.

=== Personal life ===
Sir James Gell is said to have lived a quiet life. A deeply religious man, in 1850 he married Amelia Marcia Gill, the daughter of the Reverend William Gill, the Vicar of Malew. The marriage produced six children. Sir James' second son, James Stowell Gell, followed his father into the legal profession, in turn becoming High Bailiff of Castletown and of Douglas. Another son, William, joined the priesthood, becoming Vicar of Pontefract, Yorkshire. Lady Gell died in 1899; Sir James was also pre-deceased by two of his children (John Gell and Hugh Gell).

Sir James was said to have been an ardent defender of the rights of the Manx people and a tenacious supporter of the Manx Home Rule Constitution.

=== Death ===
Until his death it was said that Sir James had enjoyed good health. He would rise early each morning and complete a large amount of correspondence before his breakfast. In mid-February 1905, Sir James had been confined to his home due to suffering from a cold. However he made a full recovery and took his seat on the bench of the Chancery Division on Wednesday 1 March. Sir James was in attendance, as a guest of the Isle of Man Steam Packet Company, for the launch of the steamer Viking at Newcastle upon Tyne on 9 March, after which he returned to the Isle of Man.

On Sunday 12 March 1905, Sir James attended divine service at the church of St Mary's on the Harbour, Castletown, taking his seat in his family pew, along with his daughter Amy. Whilst at prayer Sir James was noticed to slump over to one side. He subsequently died and the cause of death was given as heart failure.

=== Funeral ===
Sir James Gell's funeral took place on Thursday 16 March 1905. A special train, hauled by two locomotives, was required to transport people from all over the island to attend the service.

Amongst those present at the service were the Island's Lieutenant Governor, Lord Raglan; the Lord Bishop of Sodor and Man; Deemster Kneen; Deemster Moore; the Vicar General of the Isle of Man; the Attorney General, the Speaker of the House of Keys and other members of the House of Keys. Following the service the body was interred in the family vault at Malew Parish Churchyard.

== Offices of State ==
- First Deemster, 1898–1900
