= Clerk of the Rolls =

The Clerk of the Rolls (Manx: Cleragh ny Lioaryn) is a judge and Head of the Judiciary in the Isle of Man.

This position was formerly distinct from that of the Deemsters but now the Clerk of the Rolls is held jointly with the office of First Deemster.

The Clerk of the Rolls formerly had a seat in the Legislative Council.

The current Clerk of the Rolls and First Deemster is His Honour Andrew Corlett QC.

== Clerks of the Rolls ==
- John Quayle, 1736–1755
- John Quayle, 1755–1797
- Mark Hildesley Quayle, 1797 - 1804
- Thomas Stowell, 1804–1821
- John McHutchin, 1821–1847
- Mark Hildesley Quayle, 1847–1879
- Alfred Walter Adams, 1879–1882
- Sir Alured Dumbell, 1883–1900
- Sir James Gell, 1900–1905
- Thomas Kneen, 1905–1916
- Stewart Stevenson Moore, 1916–1918

In 1918, the Judicature (Amendment) Act 1918 amalgamated the offices of Clerk of the Rolls and First Deemster. Thus the Clerk of the Rolls is now the First Deemster.

== See also ==
- Deemster
- Isle of Man High Court
- Manx Judiciary
- Master of the Rolls
