= Deemster =

Judge in Isle of Man

A Deemster (Manx: briw) is a judge in the Isle of Man. The High Court of Justice of the Isle of Man is presided over by a deemster or, in the case of the appeal division of that court, a deemster and the Judge of Appeal. The deemsters also promulgate the Laws on Tynwald Day by reading out brief summaries of them in English and Manx.

In the past, the First and Second Deemsters had ex officio seats in the Legislative Council of the Isle of Man. The Second Deemster was removed from the council in 1965 and the First Deemster in 1975.

There are currently (2017) three full-time Deemsters. These are the First Deemster and Clerk of the Rolls (who is also the Deputy Governor), the Second Deemster, and an additional full-time Deemster. The offices of First Deemster, Second Deemster and Clerk of the Rolls are ancient offices. The offices of First Deemster and Clerk of the Rolls were combined in 1918, and a new office of Deputy Deemster was created in 2002 but abolished in 2009. Additional part-time Deemsters (previously called Acting Deemsters) are appointed from time to time to hear a particular case.

The First Deemster, Second Deemster and Judge of Appeal are appointed by, and hold office during the pleasure of, the Lord of Mann (acting on the advice of the UK's Secretary of State for Justice). Additional deemsters are appointed by the Lieutenant Governor on the recommendation of the First Deemster. As ex officio Deputy Governor, the First Deemster acts in place of the Lieutenant Governor in the latter's absence, or during a vacancy in that office.

Unlike judges in the United Kingdom, Deemsters have no security of tenure and thus have no legal protection against dismissal by the government. The appointment and removal of Manx judges on the formal advice of United Kingdom politicians is seen as an effective alternative.

== Current Deemsters ==
The current Deemsters are:

- First Deemster (Manx: Y Chied Vriw) and Clerk of the Rolls (Manx: Cleragh ny Lioaryn), Andrew Corlett
- Second Deemster (Y Nah Vriw), John Needham
- Deemster Graeme Cook and
- Judge of Appeal, Jeremy Storey

There is now officially a "Third Deemster", replacing the previous "Deemster".

== List of Deemsters ==
Owing to a lack of early records, the list cannot record any deemsters before 1408, and is therefore not necessarily complete for the earlier years. The dates given are those for the first appearance of a name in the records, although the person may have been in office for some time previously.

The list has been compiled from the Liber Juramentorum (the book recording the oaths taken by officers on appointment), the Isle of Man Statutes with additional names from the archive of David Craine.

== First Deemsters ==
- John McCristen, 1408
- John Clerke, 1417
- William McCrysten, 1419
- Jenkin Moore, 1419
- John Moore, 1496
- William McCorkill, 1497
- Thomas Norris, 1511
- Edward Corkill, 1524
- Thomas Sansbury, 1535
- John Lucas, 1537
- Robert Samsbury, 1540
- Hugh Clarke, 1567
- Robert Cristen, 1576
- John Curghey, 1585
- Ewan Christian, 1598
- Henry Radcliffe, 1629
- Hugh Cannell, 1637
- John Cannell, 1647
- John Christian, 1660
- Thomas Norris, 1660
- William Qualtrough, 1663
- Thomas H. Fletcher, 1663
- Edward Christian, 1669
- Charles Christian
  (assistant in the absence of his brother Edward), 1678
- Daniel Mylrea, 1693
- John Parr, 1693
- Nicholas Christian, 1724
- Charles Moore, 1736
- John Taubman, 1739
- Daniel Lace, 1757–1812
- John Quayle, 1772
- John Lace, 1793
- Norris Moore, 1812–1819
- Thomas Gawne, 1819–1823
- John Cosnahan, 1819
- John McHutchin, 1820
- John Christian, 1823–1847
- John Joseph Heywood, 1847–1855
- Sir William Drinkwater, 1855–1898
- Sir James Gell, 1898–1900
- Thomas Kneen, 1900–1905
- Stewart Stevenson Moore, 1905–1916

== First Deemsters and Clerks of the Rolls ==
- Stewart Stevenson Moore, 1916–1921
- Charles Cheslyn Callow, 1921–1934
- Reginald Douglas Farrant, 1934–1947
- William Percy Cowley, 1947–1958
- Sydney James Kneale, 1958–1969
- George Edgar Moore, 1969–1974
- Robert Kinley Eason, 1974–1980
- Arthur Christian Luft, 1980–1988
- John William Corrin, 1988–1998
- Thomas William Cain, 1998–2003
- Michael Kerruish, 2003–2010
- David Doyle 2010–2018
- Andrew Corlett, 2018–present

== Second Deemsters ==
- Peter John Heywood, 1765–1768
- Daniel Mylrea, 1768–1773
- Thomas Moore, 1773–1794
- John Crellin, 1794–1816
- Thomas Gawne, 1816–1819
- John Christian, 1819–1820
- John McHutchin, 1820–1821
- John Joseph Heywood, 1821–1847
- Sir William Drinkwater, 1847–1855
- John Clucas Stephen, 1855–1880
- Sir Alured Dumbell, 1880–1883
- Richard Sherwood, 1883–1884
- John Frederick Gill, 1884–1899
- Thomas Kneen, 1899–1900
- Stewart Stevenson Moore, 1900–1905
- Charles Callow, 1905–1921
- Frederick Malcolm Lamothe, 1921–1925
- Reginald Douglas Farrant, 1925–1934
- William Percy Cowley, 1934–1947
- Ramsey Gelling Johnson, 1947–1954
- James Arthur Cain, 1954–1957
- Sydney James Kneale, 1957–1958
- Bruce MacPherson, 1958–1963
- George Edgar Moore, 1963–1969
- Robert Eason, 1969–1974
- Arthur Luft, 1974–1980
- John William Corrin, 1980–1988
- Henry Callow, 1988–1993
- Thomas William Cain, 1993–1998
- Michael Kerruish, 1998–2003
- David Doyle, 2003–2010
- Andrew Corlett, 2011–2018
- John Needham, 2018–present

== Deemsters ==
- Andrew Corlett, 2009–2011
- Alastair Montgomerie, 2011–2019
- Graeme Cook, 2020–present

== Deputy Deemsters ==
- Andrew Williamson, 2002–2007
- Andrew Corlett, 2007–2009

== In fiction ==
One of the main characters in Alfred Hitchcock 1929 drama film The Manxman is the deemster, and his holding this position is of central importance to the film's plot. The film is based on the 1894 novel of the same name by the Manx writer Hall Caine, who published another novel with a similar theme with the title The Deemster (1887).

The 1953 George Bellairs crime novel "Half-Mast for the Deemster" features the murder of the Deemster.

== See also ==
- Tynwald
- Clerk of the Rolls
- Manx Judiciary
- Moot hill: where there were deemsters (dempsters)
