= Dumbell (disambiguation) =

Dumbell is an alternative spelling of dumbbell, a type of weight-training gear.

Dumbell may also refer to:

== People ==
- Alured Dumbell (1835–1900), Manx judge, son of George Dumbell
- George Dumbell (1804–1887), Manx advocate, businessman and philanthropist
- John Dumbell (1859–1936), New Zealand rugby union player
- Keith Dumbell (1922–2018), English virologist

== Other ==
- Dumbell's Bank of the Isle of Man founded by George Dumbell, whose insolvency in 1900 caused the "Black Saturday"
- Dumbell Mountain in state of Washington, United States
- Upper Dumbell Lake in Qikiqtaaluk Region, Nunavut, northernmost lake in the world

== See also ==
- Dumbbell (disambiguation)
