= Sweet & Swing =

Radio dance band programme

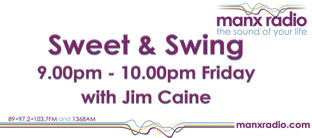
- The original Manx Radio station logo for Sweet & Swing
- Genre: Big band / swing
- Running time: Fridays, 9:00pm-10:00pm
- Country of origin: Isle of Man
- Language: English
- Home station: Manx Radio
- Starring: Howard "H" Caine
- Created by: Jim Caine
- Original release: 1990s
- Audio format: FM and MW radio and online
- Opening theme: Slow Train Blues
- Ending theme: Slow Train Blues

Sweet & Swing is a radio programme broadcast on Manx Radio, featuring music from the big band era. The show is presented by Howard Caine (known as "H"), having previously been a joint presentation with the late Jim "The Jazz" Caine, the programme's creator.

In January 2017 Manx Radio introduced a sister programme to Sweet & Swing titled Jumpin' In. Originally the sister programmes alternated on Manx Radio's Friday night schedule over a fixed schedule period until October 2019, when Jumpin' In was allocated its own designated transmission slot on Saturday night.

This was revised in June 2022, following a reshuffle of Manx Radio’s evening programme schedule, which resulted in Jumpin’ In returning to the Friday 9pm spot whilst Sweet & Swing moved to the Tuesday evening slot which had been vacated following the announcement of the suspension of The Folk Show. The revision proved to be only temporary, and Sweet & Swing resumed its Friday night transmissions on September 30.

In the summer of 2024, following a further evaluation of Manx Radio's specialist programmes in the wake of the launch of Manx Radio Gold, it was announced that the sister programmes would alternate once again with Jumpin' In returning to the Friday night 9pm transmission window. The announcement was made by Howard Caine on July 5, 2024, who stated that the programmes would work in sequence with Sweet & Swing and Jumpin' In being transmitted every other week.

Sweet & Swing features music from the 1920s through to the 1950s; however, music by contemporary big bands is also included on the playlist. The programme is transmitted on the station's 9:00pm – 10:00 pm slot on Friday nights and is broadcast on FM and MW frequencies as well as worldwide through the Manx Radio website.

== Show format ==
=== Introduction ===
The programme begins shortly after the conclusion of the previous music slot at 9:00 pm. Howard Caine commences each episode with the greeting "A very good evening to you" and then proceeds to play the show's theme tune, Slow Train Blues by Eric Winstone.

=== Main content ===
The show uses various features in the form of mini series. During its 2017 autumn-to-Christmas run, the main content was entitled Hits of the Blitz, comprising solo artists and renowned acts such as Flanagan and Allen. A new and popular dimension to the show during its spring run of 2018 was a 'Guess-the-year' feature, recalling music and news with the listener invited to recall which particular year was being referred to.

Following the death of the show's creator, a regular feature during the spring run of 2018 was devoted to Jim Caine's personal recollections. Paying tribute, the snippets recalled a personal critique of the band leaders and solo artists who had featured during previous editions of the show.

Another regular feature of the playlist is what Howard Caine refers to as a "twofah", i.e. two-for-the-price-of-one, where two recordings from a particular artist or dance band are played in succession.

=== Conclusion ===
The broadcast generally ends with Howard Caine reviewing certain aspects of that particular night's show, whilst Slow Train Blues fades in the background. The edition is then available on the Manx Radio website to be listened to again for the following seven days.In addition a library consisting of previous editions of the show going back several years are available in the form of a podcast.

The presentational style of the programme is light-hearted, educational and informative. The programme has listeners as far away from the Isle of Man as the Philippines and New Zealand.

While Manx Radio is a commercial radio station, Sweet & Swing is not interrupted by the playing of commercials. However for a time from September 2022 the show was sponsored by a Manx-based vintner.

== History ==
The programme can trace its lineage from former Manx Radio programmes of a similar genre such as the late Jim Caine's previous jazz show and Manx Radio's Big Band Hour, which was presented by Mark White, a former BBC Radio Controller. Sweet & Swing bases its format on a mixture of music from British dance bands of the 1920s and 1930s and from the big band era. The show was originally presented solely by Jim Caine, but his workload was reduced following a bout of illness; this led some listeners to fear for the show's continuance. However, Howard Caine, employed primarily as a Manx Radio journalist and newscaster, then began presenting the main content of the show.

During a broadcast on 16 December 2016, Howard Caine announced that the format of Manx Radio's 9pm Friday night music slot was to change from the beginning of 2017. Following the appointment of Alex Brindley as Manx Radio's Programme Controller, it was explained during the broadcast that a new programme relating to a more jazz-orientated presentation would occur, more resembling the previous Jim Caine's Jazz Show, with the new show to be called Jumpin' In. Transmissions began at the end of January, running through the winter period until the end of April, when it was again replaced by Sweet & Swing. The sister programmes then continued to occupy specific transmission periods for the 9 pm music slot on Friday nights, until October 2019 when Jumpin' In was allocated its own designated transmission slot on Saturday nights also at 9 pm.

=== Featured Artist ===
Until 2016, the 'Featured Artist' segment comprised the main content of the show. 'Featured Artist' would be recorded at the home of Jim Caine, referred to by his co-presenter as "The Maestro" due to his encyclopaedic knowledge of the artists and songs of the Sweet & Swing era, and would encompass a montage of previous recollections from Jim Caine concerning various artists.

Howard Caine would often refer to Jim Caine's house as either "Music Man HQ," "Maestro HQ" or "Maestro Towers" and until the change in format would begin that particular segment of the show with a brief résumé of the past week's weather before that week's chosen artist was revealed.

Numerous artists have featured over the history of the show, some of whom were known personally to Jim Caine (an accomplished jazz musician and raconteur in his own right). Such artists which have been featured include a diverse mix of repertoire ranging from the sounds of Duke Ellington, Fletcher Henderson, Ray Noble, Harry Roy, Geraldo, Tommy Dorsey, Ambrose, Ted Heath and Jack Hylton, through the swing era to the modern era with the likes of the Pasadena Roof Orchestra and The RAF Squadronaires.

Solo artists also featured, including performers such as Vera Lynn and Al Bowlly.

Of particular renown was the work of Joe Loss who spent several seasons playing at the Villa Marina, Douglas, Isle of Man during the 1950s. Another artist performing in Douglas during the immediate post-war years, and who was also acquainted with Jim Caine, was Ivy Benson. Later Bud Freeman became known to Jim Caine, with Freeman staying at the family home where he was introduced to the young Howard. Said to have been a keen player of the game Scrabble, Bud Freeman also left a token to the family consisting of one of his coats. The coat has been kept for posterity and is referred to as the "Bud Coat". Also known to the presenters was Humphrey Lyttleton, who would receive Manx kippers from Jim Caine.

== Jazz Christmas Special ==
Previously referred to as the 'Caine Gang Christmas Party', one specific programme during the course of the festive season would see "H" Caine joined by his brother Chris together with a contribution from "The Maestro". This would generally take the format of a jocular presentation with the presenters playing some personal favourite jazz numbers as well as recounting certain anecdotes.

- Howard Caine has now become one of the mainstays in the Manx Radio line up, having ostensibly traded off his former role as a newscaster.

In addition to Sweet & Swing he now also presents the popular week day show Late Lunch with Christy Dehaven, Ta Mee Ginnys alongside Beth Espey, as well as his weekly appearance on Jumpin’ In. Other presentations include Manx Radio's nature programme Mannin the Wild.

== See also ==
- Jumpin' In (radio programme)
- Jim Caine (radio presenter)
