= Jim Caine =

Manx jazz artist and raconteur (1926–2018)

- Born: James Alfred Caine; 11 June 1926; Douglas, Isle of Man
- Died: 11 April 2018 (aged 91); Braddan, Isle of Man
- Education: Sheffield University
- Occupation: Musician / radio presenter
- Years active: 1940s–2016
- Spouse: Edna Heaps (m. 1950)
- Children: 3

James Alfred Caine (11 June 1926 – 11 April 2018), known as "Jim the Jazz," was a Manx jazz pianist, radio presenter and raconteur whose career, in various parts, spanned over 70 years.

== Biography ==
=== Personal life ===
The eldest of four sons, Jim Caine was born on 11 June 1926 and raised in Douglas, Isle of Man. He was educated at Douglas High School and Sheffield University, although he left prior to graduation. After leaving university he took a position in the family-run business, an established drapery of which he was to become a director.

Jim Caine married Edna Heaps on Thursday 28 September 1950, the wedding ceremony taking place at St George's Church, Douglas, with his brother Allan officiating as best man. The couple honeymooned in Torquay, staying at the Vernon Court Hotel. The mariage produced three children.

=== Musicianship ===
Caine's career as a musician saw him appear as a support pianist in various reviews and performances. In 1946, he joined a group formed by Hugh Gibb, father of Barry, Robin, Maurice and Andy Gibb, which played at the Douglas Bay and Alexandra hotels. In addition to Caine, the line-up consisted of Hugh Gibb (drums), Arthur Crawford (accordion), Tommy Cowley (bass), Albert Metcalfe (tenor saxophone) and John Knight (trombone).

During the early 1950s, Caine formed part of the minstrel troupe appearing as Ebony in support of the Mississippi Minstrels at the Gaiety Theatre. He also appeared in support of the Conister Quartette and as a member of Harold Moorhouse and his Augmented Old Time Orchestra, featuring in a charity concert in order to raise money for victims of the 1956 Hungarian Uprising.

Recalling his father, his son Howard claimed he developed his playing style from Carroll Gibbons and Charlie Kunz, including adopting medleys where he would fuse two or three tunes together reminiscent of the style of Kunz and Gibbons.

Caine went on to form the Jim Caine Trio; comprising Caine, Tommy Cowley (double bass) and Maurice Gawne (drums) playing at various venues around the Isle of Man notable amongst which were the Villa Marina and the Arragon Hotel. It was their appearances at the Arragon which enabled the trio to establish their reputation and from where a New Year's Eve outside broadcast was transmitted, one of the first in the history of Manx Radio. Under the ownership of the former World Motorcycle Champion Geoff Duke, the Arragon Hotel was at the time considered to be one of the finest venues on the Isle of Man.

Arriving with his wife one Saturday night in 1963, Caine was informed by Pat Duke that the band which had been booked to provide music at a wedding reception had failed to turn up, and it was asked of Caine if he could oblige by providing entertainment for the wedding party. Luckily the Ballroom happened to have a fine grand piano.

The appearances of the Jim Caine Trio at the Arragon Hotel led to the release of Saturday Night at the Arragon, a compilation in the form of a compact disc featuring reel-to-reel recordings from the years 1963–1968, which in turn raised over £1,000 for Isle of Man charities. Certain extracts from the Saturday Night at the Arragon compilations featured during the Autumn series of Sweet & Swing in 2018.

Jim Caine was the secretary of the Manx Jazz Club for more than 30 years.

=== Radio ===
Caine was a regular presenter of a range of programmes on Manx Radio. His appearances began in the 1960s and consisted of him playing a varied repertoire as well as requests from listeners on his piano at his home. Other programmes which he devised included Music Miscellany, a programme featuring light classical music, and Jim's Jazz Hour which in turn evolved into Sweet & Swing. He continued to present well into his 80s, joined in a co-presentation of Sweet & Swing by his son Howard. Latterly this would take the form of recollections conducted by interview at his home, until he retired from broadcasting in 2016.

Often referred to as "The Maestro" due to his encyclopedic knowledge of the artists and bands of the Swing and Big Band eras, Caine's presentational style was relaxed and light-hearted, and on occasion he would recall various meetings with band leaders and solo artists, including Joe Loss, Ivy Benson, Bud Freeman and Humphrey Lyttleton.

== Death ==
Jim Caine died at Noble's Hospital on Wednesday, 11 April 2018; he was survived by his wife and children. His body was cremated at a private ceremony, following which there was a Service of Celebration of his life at St Peter's Church, Onchan, Isle of Man.

== See also ==
- Sweet & Swing
- Jumpin' In
- Hugh Gibb
