= Jumpin' In (radio programme) =

- Genre: Jazz music
- Running time: Fridays, 9:00pm-10:00pm
- Country of origin: Isle of Man
- Language(s): English
- Home station: Manx Radio
- Starring: Howard "H" Caine. Chris Caine
- Created by: Howard Caine & Chris Caine
- Original release: 13 January 2017
- Audio format: FM and MW radio and online
- Opening theme: Jumpin' In
- Website: https://www.manxradio.com/on-air/jumpin-in

Jumpin' In is a Manx Radio programme which is broadcast on the station's 9:00pm – 10:00pm slot on Friday nights. Jointly presented by brothers Howard and Chris Caine, the first transmission was aired on Friday 13 January 2017.

Initially Jumpin' In alternated with its sister programme, Sweet & Swing, on the station's 9pm music slot on Friday night with both programmes transmitted over a fixed transmission period.

However from October 2019 Jumpin' In was given its own dedicated transmission slot, moving to Saturday night at 9pm. This was revised in June 2022, following a reshuffle of Manx Radio’s evening programme schedule, which resulted in Jumpin’ In returning to the Friday 9pm spot whilst Sweet & Swing moved to the Tuesday evening slot which had been vacated following the announcement of the suspension of The Folk Show, although it was stated that this would be only a temporary measure. In turn both programmes resumed their previous schedule at the end of September.

In the summer of 2024, following a further evaluation of Manx Radio's specialist programmes in the wake of the launch of Manx Radio Gold, it was announced that the sister programmes would alternate once again with Jumpin' In returning to the Friday night 9pm transmission window. The announcement was made by Howard Caine on July 5, 2024, who stated that the programmes would work in sequence with Sweet & Swing and Jumpin' In being transmitted every other week.

Like its sister programme, Jumpin' In is broadcast on FM and MW frequencies as well as worldwide through the Manx Radio website. Jumpin' In takes its name from the title track of the 1983 album Jumpin' In by Dave Holland's Quintet.

Schooled by their father Jim "The Jazz" Caine, the brothers Caine individually and collectively contribute to the show, which offers a wide and rich variety of music from modern contemporary jazz across the spectrum to some lesser known music. Broadcasts have also included a special edition covering the Southport Jazz Festival. In addition the programme has also encompassed recorded interviews from the London Jazz Festival featuring artists such as John Surman and Jasper Høiby.

As it has become more established, Jumpin' In has begun to increasingly reflect the genre of the contemporary jazz scene; however the presenters often illustrate the evolution which links the sister programmes, particularly alluding to the direct connection to the music which features on the playlists of both programmes.

The first dedicated transmission on Jumpin' In referring to a particular Jazz record label was aired on Good Friday, March 30, 2018, when the entire content of the show was devoted to Edition Records, part of which included an in depth interview with Dave Stapleton.
