= Henry Bloom Noble =

Eminent Businessman and Philanthropist

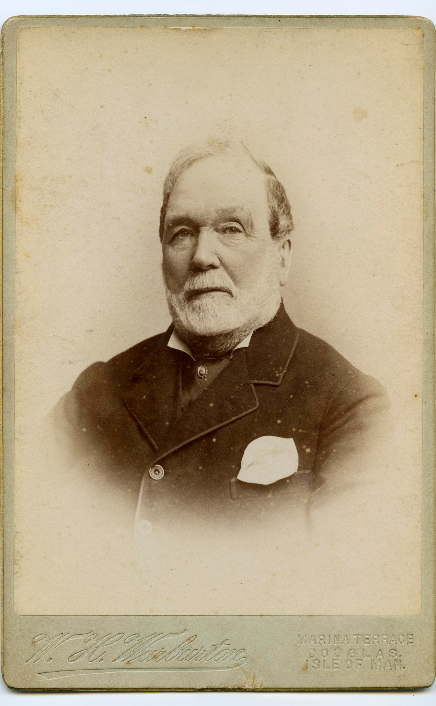
- Born: Henry Bloom Noble; 18 June 1816; Clifton, Westmorland
- Died: 2 May 1903 (aged 86); Douglas, Isle of Man
- Spouse: Rebecca Thompson (died 1888)
- Parent(s): John Noble; Mary Mason (nee Bloom)

Henry Bloom Noble JP (18 June 1816 – 2 May 1903) was an English Cumbrian-born philanthropist and businessman who at the time of his death was the richest resident of the Isle of Man. Noble bequeathed a large amount of his vast fortune to the people of the Isle of Man, resulting in numerous civic amenities such as recreation grounds, swimming baths, a library and a hospital.

== Biography ==
=== Early life ===
Henry Noble was born in the village of Clifton, Westmorland (now part of Cumbria) on 18 June 1816, the first son of John Noble and Mary (née Bloom). It is said that he came from a poor failed farming family, his father finding work as a customs official.

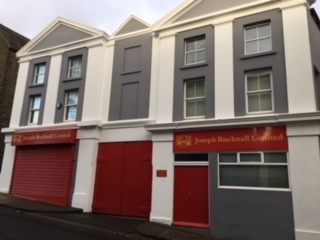
Original Henry Noble wine and spirit warehouse.

=== Business ===
==== Wine and spirits ====
His first connection with Douglas was due to his association with Alexander Spittall, father of James Spittall, a Douglas advocate. The elder Spittall was a wine and spirits merchant, whose principal place of business was Whitehaven, Cumbria, although he had a branch established in Douglas. Noble was employed by Spittall as a clerk, rising to the position of manager in 1835 following which he moved to Douglas with his mother. The Nobles took residence in a house belonging to Spittall on the south side of St Barnabas' Square. Noble did not stay in the employ of Spittall for very much longer, but set up in the wine and spirits business on his own behalf; his first shop was on Fleetwood Corner.

Henry Noble is said to have made his first money whilst still in the employ of Alexander Spittall, by speculating in the shares of the Great Laxey Mine. He continued his wholesale wine and spirits business and supplemented this by the sale of seeds and other commodities for farmers. He then opened a timber yard at the corner of the Lake under Bank's Hill. In time he transferred his wine and spirits business to premises in St George's St (now occupied by Joseph Bucknall & Sons) and had his saw pits and timber yard in the large area between Hill St and Mytle St, in the area where St Mary's Cathedral now stands: the whole block at that time belonged to Noble.

Large profits were generated from both these concerns, and this led Noble to invest in shipping.

==== Shipping ====
The first ship he owned was named Jane and Agnes, and the next the Rebecca and Maria, said to have been two of the finest and smartest schooners operating from Douglas. He used the ships in two ways:

- in connection with his own business and those of other charterers of the Port of Douglas;
- they were also put to work for the Great Laxey Mining Company.

===== Isle of Man Steam Packet Company =====
By the 1880s Henry Noble had also become a major shareholder in the Isle of Man Steam Packet Company, serving on the board of directors and being appointed chairman. However his vision for the company, which would have seen the introduction of fast screw-driven steamers from the 1880s, was in opposition to the rest of the board who favoured paddle-driven ships. This largely brought about his resignation, however by the turn of the century it was clear that Noble's vision was the way forward. After resigning from the board, Noble did not desert the company altogether, but offered financial assistance to help the company to compete in a price war with the Isle of Man, Liverpool and Manchester Steamship Company. He advanced at short notice a loan of £20,000 (£2,500,000 as of 2018). The security was a mortgage on the company, which was paid off in a short time, following the Isle of Man Steam Packet Company's acquisition of the Isle of Man, Liverpool and Manchester Steamship Company in 1888.

==== Utility companies ====
In the 1840s the town of Douglas was beginning to experience an influx of tourists, which led to a boom by the turn of the century. Noble helped the town to development infrastructure to accommodate this. He invested in the Douglas Gas Light Company and was one of the founders of the Douglas Water Works Company: he was appointed chairman, a post he held until the company was acquired by the Douglas Town Commissioners for the huge figure of £144,000 (equivalent to £18.3 million in 2018).

A certain amount of skulduggery surrounds the transaction of the money. Henry Noble was one of the founders of the Isle of Man Bank, and at the time of the purchase of the Douglas Water Works Company, the Town Commissioners banked their money with Dumbell's Bank. Noble refused a cheque drawn on Dumbell's Bank, but insisted on cash. Without the required cash at hand, the Town Treasurer was required to make provision partly in gold, with the balance made up of Bank of England notes. On the day of the transaction the gold was brought to the offices of the company and weighed, and the notes were counted. All duly accounted for, the receipt was signed by Noble and his co-directors. Had the money not been forthcoming on the specific day, a penalty clause would have been enacted increasing the consideration by £5,000 (£630,000 as of 2018) with a further penalty of £5,000 ten days later, and so on.

There was quite an outcry from Dumbell's Bank concerning Noble's behaviour, being seen as an unjustifiable attempt to reduce confidence in the bank. However given what later happened to Dumbell's Bank, it may be seen that Noble was aware of how matters stood at Dumbell's.

==== Banking ====
===== Isle of Man Bank =====
Following the passing of the Companies Act 1865 on the Isle of Man, Noble, together with William Moore, Samuel Harris and William Callister founded the Isle of Man Bank that October. Noble served as a director of the bank until he retired as a consequence of his health in the late 1890s.

==== Property ====
Noble worked in conjunction with Governor Loch on the construction of Victoria Street, then the main thoroughfare of Douglas. His astute vision led him to acquire many of the most desirable building plots in the town. He was also one of the proprietors of the Castle Mona Estate, which was sold to a syndicate for £80,000 (£10,100,000 as of 2018). The property was the former Isle of Man residence of the Dukes of Atholl. Before 1850 Queen Victoria proposed buying it as a more suitable royal residence than Osborne House.

In 1868 Noble bought the Villa Marina which at that time was rented by the Isle of Man Government as the residence of the Lieutenant Governor, Francis Pigott. Noble purchased the estate in its entirety from Frances Dutton for the sum of £7,500 (£822,500 as of 2018). It is said many people scoffed at the amount which Noble had paid, scornfully predicting that he would in no way recover the amount he had invested. However the value went up as a result of the increasing affluence of the town, to such a degree that in 1898 Noble refused an offer of £120,000 (£15,200,000 as of 2018). Upon his death the Villa Marina was bequeathed to the town of Douglas.

Noble's last open property purchase was that of the former residence of Colonel Shum for the sum of £5,400, on land where today the Sefton Hotel and the Gaiety Theatre stand. The local Hospital Committee had earmarked the land for a hospital site, but Noble, as the chief owner of property in the proximity, thwarted this attempt. In less than five years Noble had sold the site for £15,000 the site undergoing development.

== Personal life ==
Because of Noble's business dealings it was inevitable that he attracted the ire of others, being accused of sharp practice on more than one occasion. Henry Noble's only known relative was a young man named Mason. Said to have been a great favourite of his, he had stayed with him on the Isle of Man several times. It is said he went to sea, and was drowned. Noble was a staunch churchgoer, said to be of the evangelical type and together with his wife he would attend St George's Church, Douglas. The stained glass windows in the church's east end, said to be the finest of their type on the Isle of Man, were erected by him in the mid-1860s at a cost of £600 (£73,000 as of 2018).

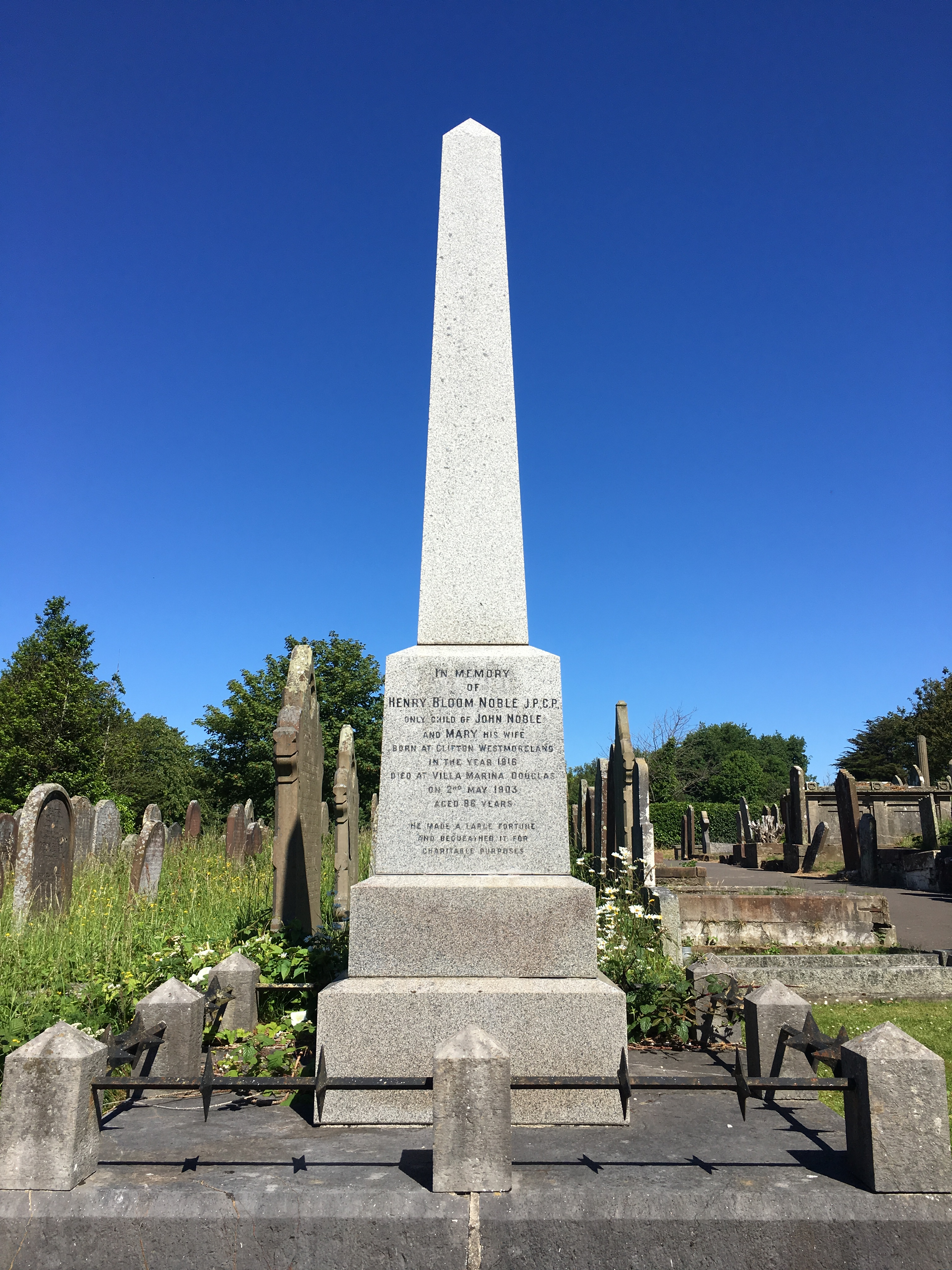
The Noble family grave, Braddan Cemetery, Isle of Man.

In 1885 Henry Noble became the Captain of the Parish of Lonan, Isle of Man a position he held until his death.

=== Marriage ===
In April 1862 Henry Noble married Rebecca Thompson, a granddaughter of Calcott Heywood (who had been a captain in the Manx Fencibles). They lived initially at the corner of Hope Street and Peel Road, until Noble bought the Villa Marina which was to become their home. The marriage produced no children. Mrs Noble is also remembered as a great benefactor to poor people, a specific legacy from her being the founding of the Douglas Orphanage, a plight which was said to be particularly close to her heart.

=== Death ===
Henry Noble died at the Villa Marina on 2 May 1903, having been predeceased by his wife. His funeral took place on Wednesday 6 May, his body being interred with that of his wife in a grave in the north corner of Braddan Cemetery.

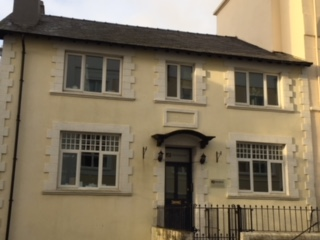
The Douglas Soup Dispensary, Myrtle St, Douglas Isle of Man. Erected for charitable purposes in 1908 and paid for by the Henry Bloom Noble Charitable Trust.

== Charitable bequests ==
Noble's legacy is one of immense generosity to the Isle of Man, particularly its capital, Douglas. Some of the beneficiaries of the munificence of Henry Noble include:

- Noble's Hospital
- Noble's Park
- Ramsey Cottage Hospital
- Knockaloe Farm
- Villa Marina
- St Ninian's Church
- Noble's Baths
- Douglas Soup Dispensary

The Henry Bloom Noble Trust is one of the longest established charities on the Isle of Man, having originally been established in 1888 as the Trustees of Noble's Isle of Man Hospital and Dispensary; the first trustees were the Lord Bishop, John Bardsley, and the Clerk of the Rolls, Sir Alured Dumbell. Following Noble's death the trust became a statutory body in 1909; and in 2003 was renamed the Henry Bloom Noble Trust. In addition the Henry Bloom Noble Scholarship Trust provides funding for Manx students to complete their education at a university in the United Kingdom.

Numerous other bequests have benefited the Isle of Man. Amongst these were £10,000 for the construction of St Ninian's Church Douglas; Ramsey Cottage Hospital; £5,000 for nursing home accommodation; and bequests to a large number of charities, including the Church Missionary Society and the British and Foreign Bible Society. Provision was also made by the trustees of the fund for the maintenance of a nurse in the parish of Lonan.

Noble was also a chief contributor to the voluntarily supported home for the aged poor, more formally referred to as the House of Industry, and for many years he supplied those in residence with their Christmas dinner. In addition there were bequests to infirmaries in Liverpool and Cumberland and a fund was set up to supply district nurses to be trained in Liverpool before returning to the Isle of Man. A tuberculosis sanatorium in Norfolk where people from the Isle of Man received care also was a beneficiary.

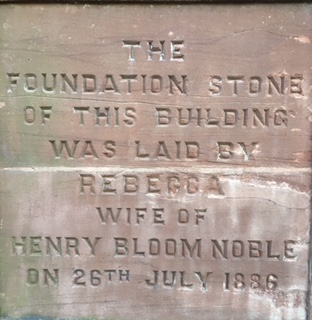
Foundation Stone of the original Noble's Hospital

=== Noble's Hospital ===
Before the 1880s the Isle of Man had suffered from the lack of a properly equipped and modern hospital; this was of particular concern to Rebecca Noble. Until then, the island's only hospital was the fever hospital in Fort Street.

Having thwarted the intention of the Isle of Man's Hospital Committee to erect a hospital on land which he had purchased, Noble let it be known that not only would he donate land for a hospital, but he would pay for building it.

Rebecca Noble bequeathed land she owned in the vicinity of what is now Crellin's Hill in 1885, and having unveiled the foundation stone she oversaw the initial construction of the hospital, although she died before its completion. Today the building which was the original Noble's Hospital houses the Manx Museum. The hospital, with the extension to Clifton House, for a nurse residence, cost Noble over £10,000 (£1,250,000 as of 2018) not including the land.

The original Noble's Hospital was replaced by a newer and much larger hospital, situated on land owned by Noble and which was located on what became the Westmorland Road, Douglas (named after the county of his birth), which opened in 1913. It was superseded by the present Noble's Hospital which opened in July 2003.

=== Noble's Park ===
Purchased in 1909 with money from the Noble Trust, Noble's Park and Recreation Grounds provide the major recreational grounds in Douglas. The first sustained, powered and controlled flight on the Isle of Man took off in July 1911 from Noble's Park, a Farnham biplane piloted by Claude Graham-White.

=== Noble's Baths ===
In December 1906 at a special meeting of Douglas Town Council, an application was made to the Trustees of Noble's will pointing out the desirability of the provision of public swimming baths, and requesting if they would be prepared to make provision for the same, pointing out that the corporation had had an offer of the baths situated in Victoria St, Douglas, together with adjacent recreational venues. A council committee approached the owners finally agreeing on a purchase price of £8,750 (£1,023,000 as of 2018). In addition the Borough Surveyor had costed the amount required to put the baths into working order and condition to be £1,000 (£118,000 as of 2018).

In response, John Clarke, Secretary of the Trustees, wrote to the council advising that the Trustees were willing to make a bequest of £10,000 (£1,169,000 as of 2018), citing that the acquisition of the Victoria St baths would be of immense benefit to the town of Douglas, however citing the following proviso:

- That the baths be called the Henry Bloom Noble Public Baths
- All rents from properties let, and monies received from the bathers, to be expended in the maintenance of the premises, and all profits to be expended improving the baths
- Arrangements to be made for free swimming classes for school children at least one day per week during the winter months
- The baths to be vested in the Corporation of Douglas

The inauguration ceremony of Noble's Baths took place on Wednesday 1 July 1908, and was an occasion of immense civic pride for the town. The baths served the town until they were replaced by Derby Castle Aquadrome, part of the Summerland Complex, in 1969.

=== Knockaloe Farm ===
Knockaloe, the Isle of Man Government's experimental farm, was created on 350 acres of waste ground in 1924. The site had been a prison encampment during the Great War, known as Knockaloe Camp, and was linked to the Douglas - Peel railway line by a branch line. A benefaction from the Henry Bloom Noble Trustees was responsible for the creation of the farm.
