= Dumbell's Bank =

Bank in the Isle of Man

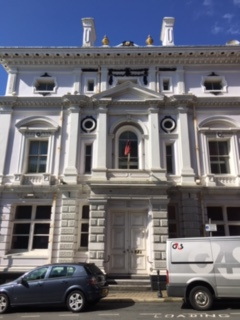
- The former Dumbell's Bank building, Douglas, Isle of Man
- Type: Private Limited Company
- Industry: Financial services
- Founded: 1874; 152 years ago
- Headquarters: Douglas, Isle of Man
- Key people: George William Dumbell, Louis Geneste Howard, William Dumbell, Alured Dumbell, Charles Nelson, Alexander Bruce, John Shimmon, William Aldred, William Vincent Aldred, Ridgway Harrison, William Baring Stevenson, James Spittall

Dumbell's Bank was a bank in the Isle of Man. The bank's insolvency in 1900, known as Black Saturday and referred to in the Isle of Man as the Dumbell's Bank Crash, resulted in a run on the bank with many individuals losing their life savings and the ruin of numerous local businesses causing poverty, depression and bankruptcy. The effects were profound and lasted for a considerable number of years.

== History ==
=== Origins ===
In comparison with established institutions in the United Kingdom, banking in the Isle of Man was recent in origin. At the beginning of the 19th century the entirety of the island's banking business was confined to the firms of Litter, Dove & Co., and Beatson & Copeland; later in the first decade Messrs Quayle, Taubman & Kelly formed a banking operation in Castletown; however these concerns did not last very long.

By 1817 there were five banks in the island authorised to transact banking business and issue notes. In 1843 Forbes Bank collapsed, which in turn resulted in great hardship for many islanders. In 1854 the Isle of Man Commercial Bank became the Bank of Mona, a branch of the City of Glasgow Bank, but in this instance also there was a failure of the parent institution and they ceased operations in 1878. The insecurity of banking operations in the island was also illustrated by the collapse of Holmes' Bank in 1854 with total liabilities of £300,000.

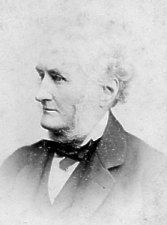
George W. Dumbell

=== Establishment ===
==== Douglas and Isle of Man Bank ====
In 1853, following the failure of Holmes' Bank, George Dumbell, a local advocate and Member of the House of Keys, established a private bank of Dumbell, Son & Howard, in association with his son William Dumbell and Louis Howard, with its office in St. George's Street, Douglas. Branches were later opened in Ramsey and Castletown.

Dumbell, Son & Howard did a significant amount of business with the agricultural community in the Isle of Man; however in August 1857, only four years after the commencement of business, a notice was posted by Dumbell's advising:

"The Bank is compelled to suspend business for the present. No doubt need be felt that everyone will be paid in full, and that very speedily. GEO. W. DUMBELL. Douglas, 22 August 1857."

In addition the Bank of Mona also suspended business for a time. Both banks later reopened, and in October 1861 George Dumbell, together with his partner Louis Howard, took over new premises on Prospect Hill, Douglas.

In 1862 Dumbell's Bank secured the account of the Great Laxey Mining Company. At that time George Dumbell was Chairman of the Great Laxey Mining Company, and by securing the account obtained an outlet for the circulation of the bank's notes: every miner whose weekly wage exceeded 20 shillings would be paid with a Dumbell's Bank note. In September 1864 William Dumbell, eldest son of George Dumbell, became a third partner of the bank.

With the passing of the Companies Act on the island in 1864, the Isle of Man Banking Company Limited opened with premises in Athol St, Douglas, and became the main rival to Dumbell's Bank.

==== Dumbell's Banking Company Limited ====
A new prospectus was issued for Dumbell's Bank in 1874 and the capital was much oversubscribed. Dumbell's Banking Company Limited was created, with a subscribed capital of £180,000, in 30,000 shares of £6 each, of which £2 per share to be paid: £1 on application and £1 on allotment, making a paid-up capital of £60,000. The directors of the new company comprised: Ridgway Harrison; Woodside, Receiver General of the Isle of Man; George W. Dumbell MHK, Belmont, Managing Director; William. Baring Stevenson, J.P., Balladoole; Richard Penketh, MHK, Hampton Court; James Spittall, Ballaughton House.

Several large accounts were at that time held by Dumbell's; these included: the Isle of Man Mining Company, the Isle of Man Government, Douglas Town Board, the Isle of Man Railway Company and the Isle of Man Steam Packet Company.

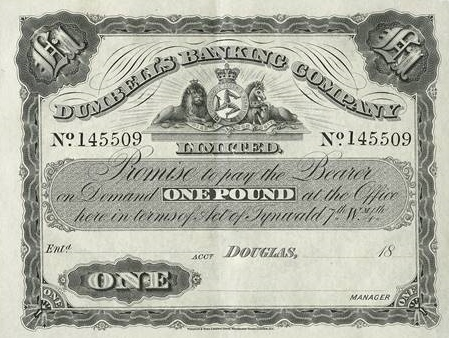
Dumbell's £1 banknote

Following the Great Manx Bank Robbery of 1878 when the Bank of Mona was robbed of almost £9,000 there was a run on other local banks. The Isle of Man Bank chartered a special steamer to convey £20,000 to the island, but Dumbell's got by without any special provision.

Alured Dumbell, a son of George Dumbell, was appointed Second Deemster in 1880 and as a consequence was obliged to resign his directorship of the bank.

In 1882 a new bank opened in the island named the Manx Bank Ltd which continued until 1900 when it was absorbed by a bank based in Lancashire.

In 1883 a local advocate, Charles Nelson, joined the bank's directors. Nelson came from an old Manx family, he was Chairman of the Manx Northern Railway and his father and grandfather had both been Rectors of Kirk Bride.

By the late 1880s Dumbell's Bank showed signs of decline; one of which was the loss of £15,000 which the bank had invested in the Peel Chemical Company.

Following the death of George Dumbell in 1887 the bank continued in its liberal approach to its business. This was a period of economic boom in the island, with the bank lending to builders and speculators on a grand scale. Two years later Dumbell's Bank paid a dividend of 15%.

One incident at the time which indicated a degree of mistrust in Dumbell's Bank centred around a transaction involving Douglas Town Commissioners. The Town Commissioners had bought a water supply from a local businessman, Henry Noble, for a consideration of £147,247; however Noble refused to accept a cheque drawn on the bank and insisted on payment in cash. There may however be another dimension to this as Henry Noble was a founder of the rival Isle of Man Bank. However suspicions of Dumbell's Bank existed in other financial circles. Dumbell's Bank had been instrumental in financing the Douglas & Laxey Electric Tramway Company Ltd and it became a constant drain on the bank.

=== Black Saturday ===
A crisis for Dumbell's Bank came on 2 February 1900, when there was a run on the bank, forcing it to close its doors at its head office on Prospect Hill. Many working people had not received their weekly wages and on the following day, referred to as "Black Saturday", the bank was still besieged. Trade underwent a period of stagnation and shares were unmarketable for many months. Shares in the Tramway Company fell from 27 shillings to 1 shilling, shares in the Isle of Man Steam Packet Company fell from 19 shillings to 12 shillings and Amalgamated Breweries share price fell from 20 shillings to 11 shillings. So acute was the crisis that certain merchants from Liverpool closed their accounts in the Isle of Man.

Another consequence of the bank's failure was that businesses which had incurred liabilities with Dumbell's were unable to arrange with other financial institutions to take over their liability to Dumbell's, and this led to a series of failures with a further knock-on effect; and the closing of the bank resulted in a long list of bankruptcies. There were similar scenes outside the branch offices. In Ramsey a further bank run resulted in a big rush of people coming in from the surrounding countryside.

News of the suspension of Dumbell's Bank caused consternation in Laxey. Most of the local tradespeople and residents held accounts with the bank, and a large proportion of the monthly remittances, sent back to the island by Manx miners working in South Africa, were deposited in the bank. Anxiety was felt for the miners employed in the Great Laxey Mine who received their monthly pay mainly in Dumbell's notes, and this was only allayed when it was discovered that the Isle of Man Bank was prepared to receive the miners' wages in return for gold. On Monday February 5, the bank's Laxey Branch was besieged by people wishing to withdraw their money.

Over 200 shareholders attended an extraordinary general meeting of Dumbell's on 12 February. One director sharply criticised the general manager and manager, with other shareholders in turn criticising the directors, accusing them of profligacy and a cavalier lending policy which had contributed immensely to the bank's demise. Accusations and counter-accusations were in turn levelled at the bank's directors. Alexander Bruce, the principal manager, wrote from his sick bed to deny a statement from the Chairman that the balance sheet had been drawn up irregularly. Another manager, John Shimmon, wrote to refute an allegation that there was an undisclosed liability to the Tramway Company in the sum of £65,000 (this liability would later be proven during the liquidation). In April 1900 there was a creditor's petition to the Chancery Court for the winding up of the company. Dumbell's premises and goodwill were acquired by Parr's Bank for £40,300.

=== Liquidation ===
The liquidators of Dumbell's Bank found the bank's affairs in such a complicated state that it took several months to unravel the accounts, to find out its true position and to crystallise it so in order for exact charges to be formulated.

On 13 June 1900, four months after the collapse the preliminary inquiry began before High Bailiff Samuel Harris who had himself on a former occasion been a trustee of the founder of the bank when it had closed for a time in 1857 and had also wound up Holmes' Bank. The accused were: Charles Nelson (advocate and director); John Shimmon (secretary and manager) and three accountants: John Rogers, William Aldred and William Vincent Aldred. The charges against Alexander Bruce were withdrawn due to the state of his health (he subsequently died before the end of the trial).

The preliminary proceedings before the High Bailiff were followed by a Court of Criminal Inquiry, again before High Bailiff Samuel Harris, at which a jury of six decided there was sufficient evidence for the defendants to stand trial.

=== Trial ===
==== First Indictment ====
The Court of General Gaol trial of the accused commenced on 5 November 1900, with the Tynwald Court specially fitted out for the trial. Presiding at the trial were the Lieutenant Governor of the Isle of Man, Lord Henniker (President), Harry Shee QC, Recorder of Burnley, who was specially commissioned and sworn in as a Deemster, and Deemster Stevenson Moore. In the first part of the trial, which lasted for nine days, Shimmon broke down under cross examination and wept bitterly. It was revealed that Dumbell's Bank had in the region of 8,000 investors and 750 shareholders, all chiefly in the Isle of Man. The charge against the defendants was one of: "unlawfully making, circulating and publishing three balance sheets which they knew to be false in certain material particulars, and which were intended to deceive the shareholders and creditors."

The liquidator in his evidence stated that he had extracted from the bank accounts £470,000 in bad debts to June 1898 of which approximately £200,000 was irrecoverable. Another point of criticism was the sum of £65,000 owing to the London City and Midland Bank which actually appeared as a credit to Dumbell's. The sum was connected with the Tramway Company.

Nelson was said to have handled in the region of £871,000 in the 20 years of his association with the bank, and in one five-year period he dealt with £270,000. His own accounts showed a profit of £20,000 for 1893 but this was down to £827 by 1898. Nelson's defence was that he had been: "drawn into a whirlpool of speculation by Alexander Bruce, and knew little of the inner workings and he had no intention whatsoever to deceive."

After two hours of deliberation the jury returned a verdict of guilty against Nelson; however his sentence was postponed until further charges against him and Shimmon had been heard.

==== Second Indictment ====
The second indictment was that Nelson and Shimmon had fraudulently appropriated to their own use money belonging to the bank. On the 12th day of the trial (the 3rd day of the second part of the proceedings) the jury returned a verdict of guilty against all the defendants.

==== Sentence ====
Nelson and Shimmon each received 5 years penal servitude for fraudulently appropriating money belonging to the bank. On the charge of issuing false balance sheets Nelson and Shimmon received 3 years to run concurrently. For his part, Rogers received 18 months imprisonment with hard labour whilst William Aldred received 12 months with hard labour and William Vincent Aldred 6 months with hard labour. In January 1901 William Aldred was released on the grounds of poor health: he was 77 years old.

After serving his sentence Nelson resumed practice as an advocate.

== Sources ==
Bibliography

- Connery Chappell The Dumbell Affair Prescot: Stephenson 1981 0-901314-21-8
