= St Ninian's Church, Douglas =

Church in Douglas, Isle of Man

St Ninian's Church
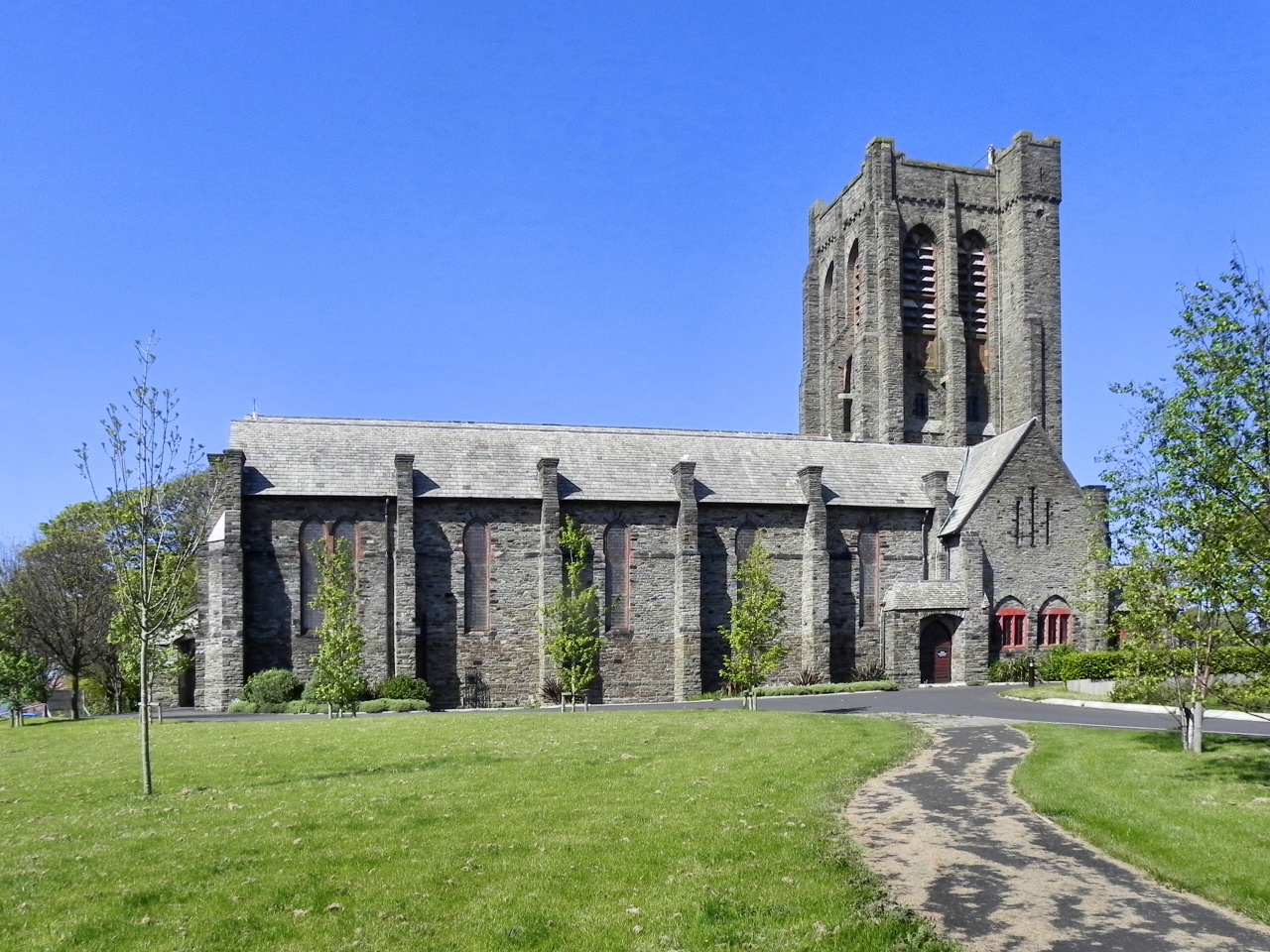

- Location within Isle of Man
- 54.1649°N 4.4832°W
- Location: Saint Ninians Road, Douglas IM2 5BT.
- Country: Isle of Man
- Denomination: Church of England
- Tradition: [Open Evangelical]
- Website: Church website

History
- Founded: 1913
- Dedication: Saint Ninian
- Consecrated: 1914

Architecture
- Functional status: Active
- Architect: W. D. Caröe
- Style: Gothic Revival

Administration
- Diocese: Diocese of Sodor and Man

Clergy
- Vicar: Reverend Canon John Coldwell

St Ninian's Church is an Anglican church in the Parkfield area of Douglas, Isle of Man, and falls within the Diocese of Sodor and Man.

== History ==
St Ninian's Church was built on land which was owned by the renowned philanthropist Henry Noble; the construction cost was also met from Noble's estate. Built in the Gothic Revival style, the architect was W. D. Caröe.

It is thought that the dedication to St Ninian reflects Noble's Cumbrian heritage (he was born at Clifton, Cumbria) and the county's association with St Ninian.

On 6 July 1913 the Bishop of Sodor and Man conducted the ordination of the Reverend Gleave of St John's College, Cambridge, who was admitted a deacon and became the first curate of the church.

The first wedding in the newly-opened church was on 17 September 1913, when Peter Kissack married Vera Handley.

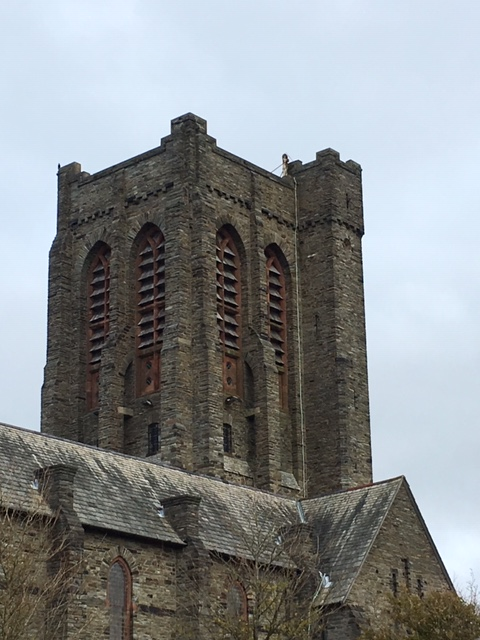
The imposing bell tower of St Ninian's Church.

St Ninian's Church was consecrated on 25 March 1914 by the Bishop of Sodor and Man, Dr Denton Thompson. The large congregation included the Lieutenant Governor of the Isle of Man, Lord Raglan and members of his family; the Clerk of the Rolls, Thomas Kneen; the Attorney General, George Ring; Deemster George Callow; High Bailiff James Gell; and the Mayor of Douglas accompanied by several members of the borough council.

The Vicar General read the deed of consecration, which was signed by the Bishop.

=== Windows ===
St Ninian's Church features prominent stained glass windows in its eastern end in memory of Henry Noble and his wife Rebecca, as well as several Celtic saints. The unveiling ceremony took place on 14 September 1913 and was performed by Rev. Canon Kermode, Vicar of St George's.

The window consists of four lights, two showing the Ascension of Jesus and two showing the Resurrection. Above is a small window decorated with the arms of the Diocese of Sodor and Man. On the north and south sides of the chancel are four lights, two on each side, with figures representing St German, St Columba, St Maughold and St Patrick. In the side chapel there are two lights at the east end, with figures of St Ninian and St Martin; and two lights on the north side representing St Bridget and St Kentigern.

The windows were designed and installed by Horace Wilkinson Ltd of London.

== Modern use ==
Today St Ninian's Church continues to play an active part in the life of the local community.

It is a registered building.

== St Ninian's Church Hall ==
Built by Messrs Callow and Sons of Douglas in 1930, St Ninian's Church Hall was constructed from artificial stone. This method of construction had several advantages:

- The stones could be cast to various shapes and sizes.
- All joints could be interlocking joints.
- Enabled more precise polishing and finishing.

The hall was used for various recreational activities until it was demolished in the early 2000s. Today the area where the church hall was situated has been developed into residential accommodation.

== See also ==
- Diocese of Sodor and Man
- Bishop of Sodor and Man
