= Hugh Gibb =

English musician (1916–1992)

- Also known as: Hughie
- Born: Hugh Leslie Gibb; 15 January 1916; Manchester, England
- Died: 6 March 1992 (aged 76) Las Vegas, Nevada, US
- Genres: Big band
- Occupations: Musician; delivery man; photographer
- Formerly of: The Hughie Gibb Orchestra
- Spouse: Barbara Pass (m. 1944)

Hugh Leslie Gibb (15 January 1916 – 6 March 1992) was an English drummer, bandleader and the father of musicians Barry, Robin, Maurice and Andy Gibb. Barry, Robin and Maurice would go on to form the Bee Gees, one of the most successful musical groups of all time, while Andy was a solo performer.

== Life and career ==
=== Early life and family background ===
Hugh Leslie Gibb was born in the Chorlton district of Manchester to Edith Yardley and Hugh Gibb. He said: "I was the oddball in my family 'cause I liked music and the attitude was that it would never do you any good. The main theme then was go to work, have a steady job, and bring your wages home every weekend. A side track from that wasn't right in their eyes. To be a musician was like the old days, you know, when they were considered vagabonds, and that's all I ever wanted to do."

Gibb's father was born in Lanarkshire, Scotland, in 1876. His mother was born in Manchester in 1892 to Hannah and William Yardley. Hannah was 16 years younger than her husband and became stepmother to the seven children he had from his previous marriage to Annie. Annie died in 1889 at the age of 38. Gibb's grandfather, Thomas Yardley, was born in 1826 and is recorded as being a railway worker.

=== Barbara Pass ===
Barbara Pass (1920-2016) was a dance band vocalist and on one of her nights off she went with a friend to another dance hall. Later, she said: "That's where it all started." Gibb escorted Pass home that night and thereafter they were romantically involved. Despite the war, Gibb had fond memories of meeting his future wife, and said: "People enjoyed themselves more. Kids to-day think they've done everything by the time they're 18 and have nothing to look forward to." They were married on 27 May 1944 in Manchester. Their first child, daughter Lesley, was born on 12 January 1945. Shortly afterwards they moved to Scotland where Gibb's band played in Edinburgh; as his wife Barbara explained: "We lived just at the outskirts of Edinburgh." After a while, the family returned to the Manchester area, living in Stretford with Barbara's mother, Nora Pass. Gibb then got a job on the Isle of Man and the family moved to its capital, Douglas. Gibb played in the city's Douglas Bay and Alexandra hotels.

At 8:45 am on 1 September 1946, at Jane Crookall Maternity Home, Douglas, Gibb's first son Barry was born. On 22 December 1949, also at the Jane Crookall Maternity Home Gibb's second and third sons Robin and Maurice were born at 3:15 am and 3:50 am respectively. Gibb and his family remained in Douglas until 1955, when they returned to the Manchester area. Of his time in Douglas, Gibb said, "I stayed there for [about] 10 years and Joe Loss's band used to be there; that was the big band era." On 5 March 1958, Hugh's fourth son Andy was born in Stretford Memorial Hospital in Manchester.

=== Career ===
"What Dad did, unknowingly, was to play a lot of music that was inspirational to writing, I would say the Mills Brothers, regarding my dad's input from them to us, was probably when you are on stage, smile. If you feel like crap and look like crap, people will feel like crap too. Dad would always be down the back holding a smiley face because that's what the Mills Brothers did. I really did think that Dad wanted us to be little white Mills Brothers".

— Maurice Gibb

Gibb's band, the Hughie Gibb Orchestra, played Mecca ballrooms mainly in Northern England and Scotland. Rosalia Black, who was the daughter of hotel owner Carlo Raineri recalled, "The band must have been popular because the ballroom was always packed, even though the Joe Loss Orchestra was at the Villa Marina and Ronnie Aldrich, with the Squadronaires, was at the Palace Ballroom."

Gibb was always on the lookout for work. Even as a popular musician, he did not earn much, and he often put together bands for one-off gigs. One such dance might have been the Invitation Dinner Dance held at London's Metropole Hotel on 24 February 1949; the reception was at 7:00 pm, and the title of the show was 'Hughie Gibb and his Music', entertaining the people until 1:00 am.

Gibb did not actually play on board the ferry, and his band was not paid by Douglas's Corporation, who ran the ferry. Apart from trumpeter Charlie Whewell, others who played in Hugh's band in 1946 consisted of Arthur Crawford (accordion), Jim Caine (piano), Tommy Cowley (bass), Albert Metcalfe (tenor saxophone) and John Knight (trombone).

Aside from being a musician Gibb worked delivering bread. As their neighbour, Joan Hill, said: "We were all very poor in those days and Mr. Gibb was a godsend. He used to bring home dozens of loaves that had to be sold before the end of the day - bread must have been much more wholesome in those days - didn't have all the preservatives it does today. Hugh would then be able to sell these off to neighbours at a fraction of the normal cost." Gibb's musical background is credited as the Bee Gees' inspiration to follow a musical career, however his influence on his sons was more indirect.

Gibb credited his wife's sister Peggy with the idea of emigrating to Australia, as she eventually did with her family. Later, he and Barbara applied for passage to Australia but did little to prepare for the move. As Gibb said, "Because they say, don't dispose of your property until you know what you're doing. Sometimes you have to wait two years; we got it in six weeks." At the beginning of August 1958, the family sailed for Australia.

When they arrived in Queensland, Gibb found work as a "bush photographer". His photography assignments were not frequent so he took on extra work for Scarborough Local Council.

Gibb remembers that the group's break came when television was started in Brisbane around 1960: "We auditioned for one of the variety shows, anything goes right way, they signed us." When the family moved back to the UK, on 7 February 1967, at 7:40 am, the 'phone rang. Robert Stigwood, Brian Epstein's partner, said: "Look, we've been doing a lot of reshuffling in the office here, and we've just come across the acetate you sent us, and we played it. Could you come along and see us this afternoon?" By November 1971, Gibb and his wife Barbara had moved to Ibiza, Spain with their son Andy and granddaughter, Beri.

=== Later years and death ===
On 6 March 1992, Gibb died of internal bleeding, at the age of 76, after years of "heavy drinking". He is buried in the Court of Remembrance section of Forest Lawn Memorial Park, Los Angeles where his son Andy is also buried. Barry Gibb's reaction to his father's death was "I believe all this was meant to happen. I miss my father of course, but he stopped living when Andy died and I'm sure he's happier now."
