= Gaiety Theatre, Isle of Man =

Historic theatre in Douglas, Isle of Man

Coordinates: 54.155°N 4.478°W

Gaiety Theatre and Opera House
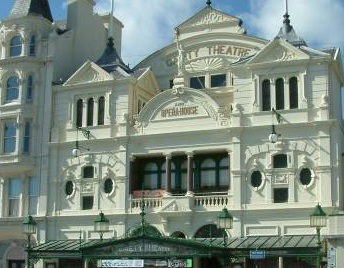
- Ornate facade of the theatre
- Interactive map of Gaiety Theatre and Opera House
- Address: Harris Promenade; Douglas; Isle of Man
- Owner: Department of Education, Sport and Culture
- Capacity: 878

Construction
- Opened: 16 July 1900
- Rebuilt: 1976 (Victor Glasstone [partial restoration]); 1984 and (Mervin Stokes MBE (full restoration)
- Architect: Frank Matcham

Website
- Venue Website

The Gaiety Theatre and Opera House is a theatre in Douglas, Isle of Man which together with the Villa Marina forms the VillaGaiety complex. The Gaiety is situated on Harris Promenade, overlooking the sea and adjacent to the Villa Gardens, Arcade and Butts.

Built in 1899 to the designs of architect Frank Matcham as an opera house and theatre, the Gaiety, along with the nearby Villa Marina, stands on the site of a lodge occupied in the early 19th century by Castle Mona architect and Atholl family retainer George Steuart, and then later bought by benefactor Henry Bloom Noble and donated for recreational use.

== History ==
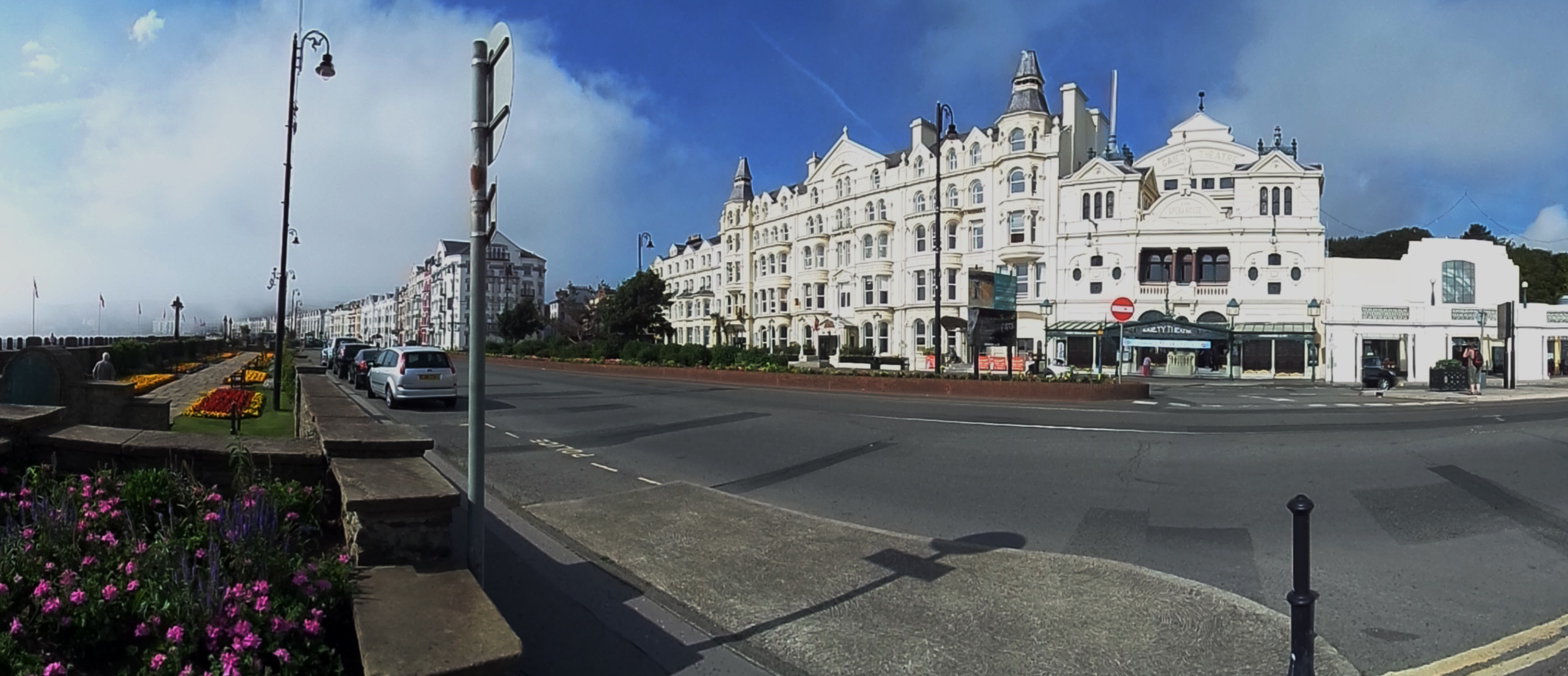
Theatre location on Harris Promenade

=== The Marina ===
To provide entertainment to the numerous tourists, adverts were placed in January 1893 to attract shareholders to form a company and build a new palace of entertainment. This was The Marina, which opened in April 1893. To create the space needed a "Belfast Roof" was built, meaning a barrel vaulted roof was formed from iron sections bolted together into hoops which were then reinforced and faced with laminated wood. However the venture was not a success, and the Marina closed after only three months when the company became bankrupt. In January 1894, the building was auctioned and bought by a consortium of creditors. Not wanting to be associated with the bankrupt company, the building was renamed.

=== The Pavilion ===
The Marina re-opened as The Pavilion in February 1894 with a concert by a Douglas choir. The venue was operated by the Pavilion Company Ltd which was headed by Richard Maltby Broadbent, the man who turned Groudle Glen into pleasure gardens and was instrumental in the construction of the Groudle Glen Railway. The idea was that the Pavilion would match the theatres and dance halls at other resorts such as Blackpool and was used for concerts, music halls, exhibitions, bazaars and, in one summer, roller skating. In 1899 the company merged with the Palace and Derby Castle Company.

=== Gaiety Theatre ===
The new owners enlisted the services of Frank Matcham to carry out an extensive renovation of the venue with Matcham presenting his plans for the theatre to Douglas Corporation in March 1899. Part of the plans saw the creation of a dome above the stalls which included a stained glass ceiling lit from above together with an elegant and playful interior inside the narrow shell of the Pavilion's Belfast Roof and the remains of the Villa house.

The stage was extended by 42 ft (12.8 m) and the resulting loss of seating was made up for by enlarging the circle and adding the third level. The under-stage machinery was installed by the Douglas firm of J.L. Killip & Collister of Tynwald Street.

The new entrance facade, with its upstairs loggia, pedimented towers and flamboyant stucco decoration, took its inspiration from the buildings of the Italian Renaissance, while the interior, with its ceiling paintings and ornate plasterwork, combined Baroque and Elizabethan elements. An ingenious feature was what was known as a "sunburner". This consisted of 7 gas lamps just below the glass ceiling with an open vent in the centre of the glass. As the gas lamps heated up, they caused the hot air around them to rise and fresh air would flow through vents at floor level to replace it. This was an early form of air conditioning. Sunburners can be found in other theatres including Matcham's theatre in Buxton, Derbyshire, and the Lyceum in Crewe which boasts the only existing working sunburner.

The theatre opened on 16 July 1900, with a West End production of "The Telephone Girl" featuring Ada Blanche. The theatre enjoyed considerable success in the Edwardian era until the outbreak of the First World War in 1914, but then much harder times set in after the war and the theatre fell into decline along with the Island's tourist industry.

Various attempts were made to regain its former commercial success, including installation of cinema equipment in the 1920s and a 1938 ice show.

The Second World War period and aftermath saw deterioration of the building outside the means of the owners to repair and by 1970 the theatre came "just one signature away" from being demolished. In 1971, the Isle of Man Government acquired the dilapidated building from the Palace and Derby Castle Company for the sum of £41,000. It also granted a further £9,000 for essential repairs, as the circle bar, toilets and stage all needed a revamp.

== Restoration ==
In 1976, the restoration began under the direction of architect and theatre expert, Victor Glasstone. The theatre underwent further restoration, under the direction of Mervin Stokes, MBE, from the 1990s to replicate its 1900 opening condition in time for the centenary celebration in 2000. Exactly 100 years after opening, on 16 July 2000, the centenary was celebrated with a performance of "The Telephone Girl" which opened the Gaiety in 1900 and following which was a performance of "The Corsican Brothers," a popular play which in Victorian times and a special 'Corsican Trap' was constructed for the performance. It is the only working Corsican Trap in the World. Another unique feature of the theatre is the working Victorian Act Drop depicting a dancing lady.

The restoration of the Gaiety Theatre was directed over several years by the theatre manager of the day, Mervin Russell Stokes, who was later made an MBE for his contribution to the project. Stokes, with others, arranged for the funding and closely supervised the work done, carrying out some of it himself, always with a view to strict authenticity, even down to having the original paint colours, wallpaper and carpeting recreated, to return the building to as near its original appearance as possible.

== Current use ==
Today the theatre continues with productions by local companies and touring productions of musicals, drama and opera. It now forms a part of the VillaGaiety complex together with the Villa Marina, a nearby 1,620 capacity auditorium.

The Gaiety Theatre featured on Isle of Man commemorative stamps in 1987, 1994 and 2000.

== Friends of the Gaiety ==
In 1978, the organisation Friends of the Gaiety was formed to undertake fundraising for the theatre’s restoration, and to assist with day-to-day operations.

== Filmography ==
In February 2008, The Gaiety hosted a Hollywood movie, Me and Orson Welles, which starred Zac Efron, Christian McKay, and Claire Danes. The Gaiety stood in for the Mercury Theatre in 1937 New York, which had been demolished in 1942.

== Gallery ==
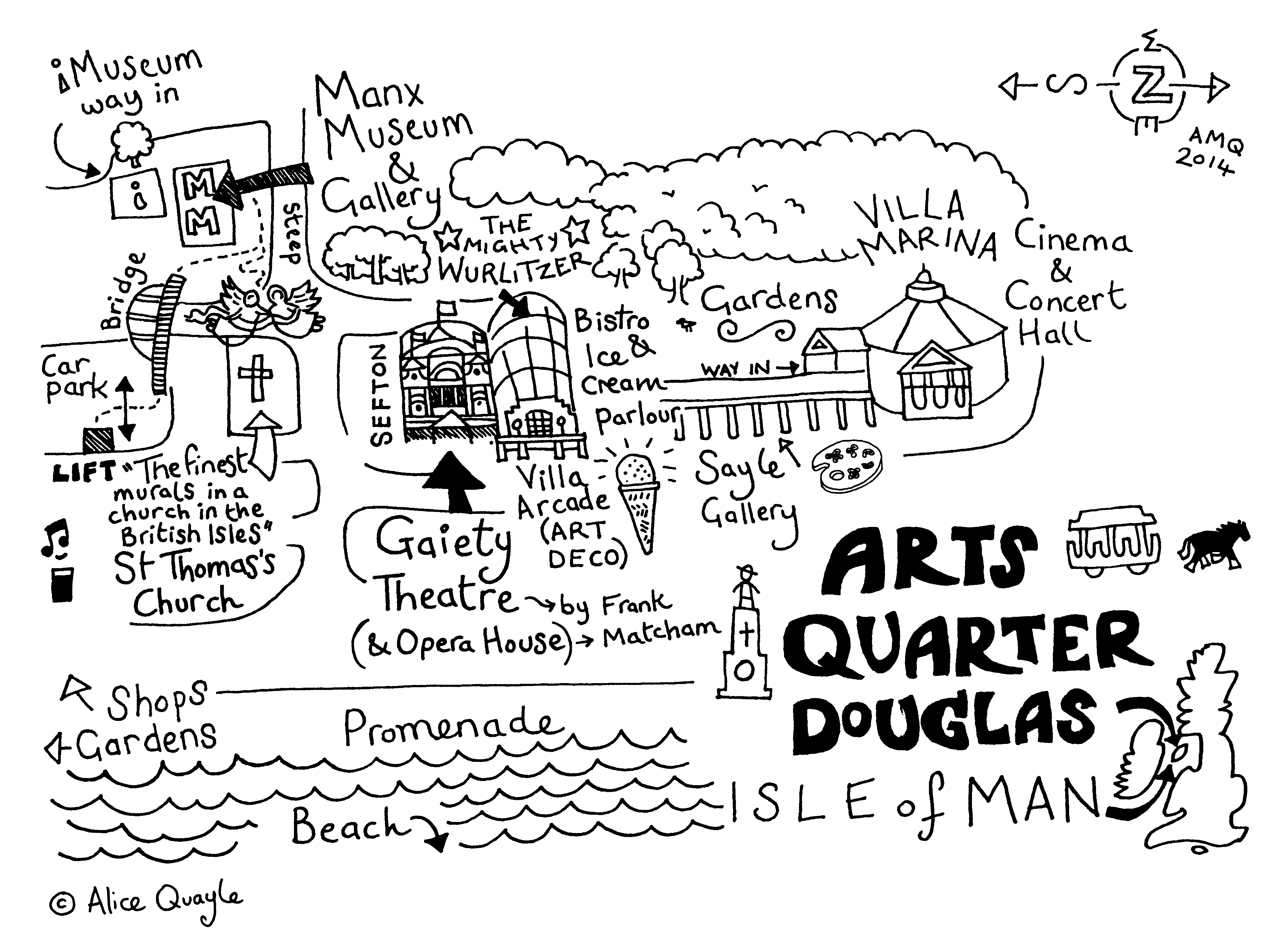
An illustration showing Douglas Arts & Culture Quarter

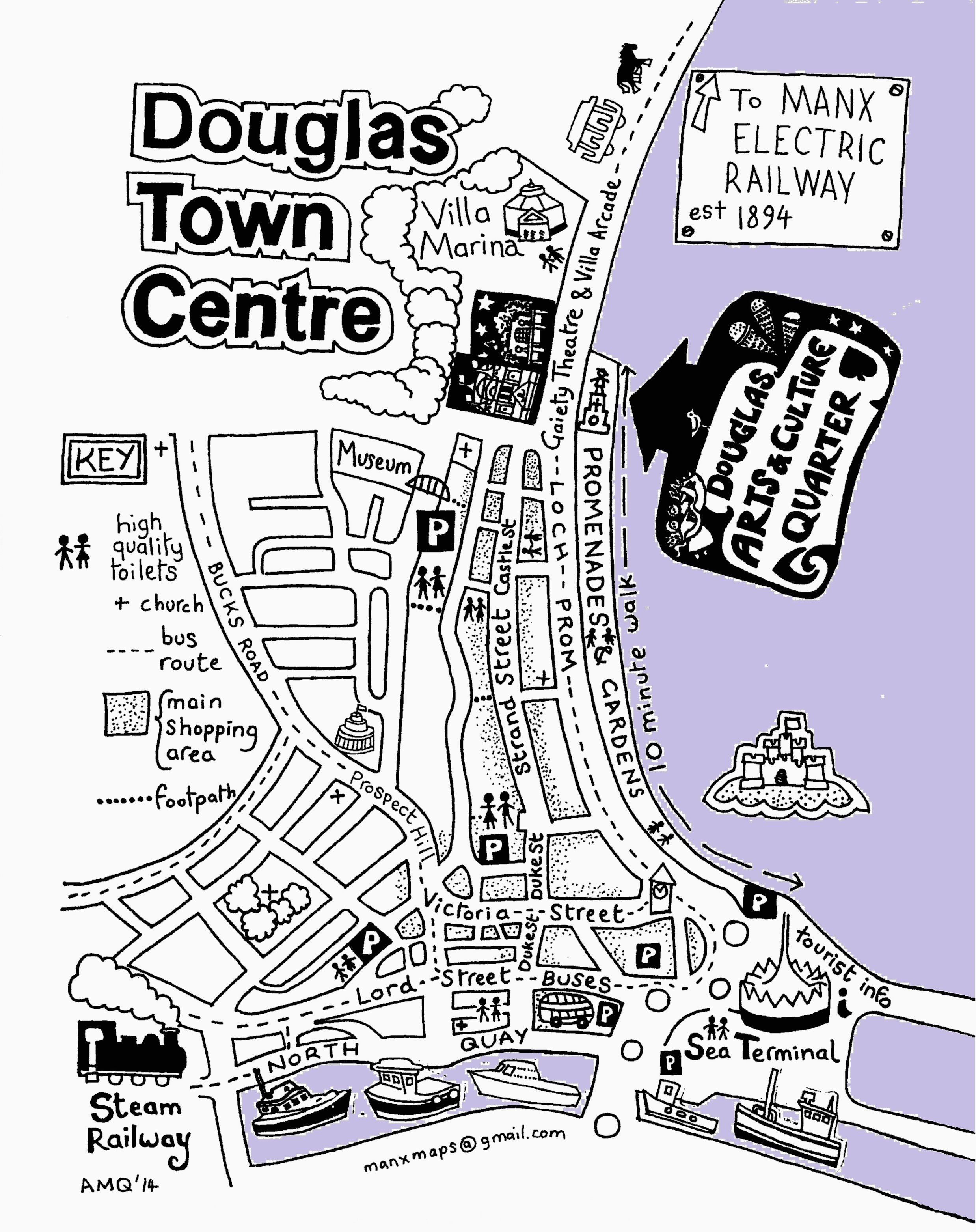
A map of the centre of Douglas for Douglas Development Partnership
