= Nelly Brennan =

Historical figure on the Isle of Man

Eleanor Brennan
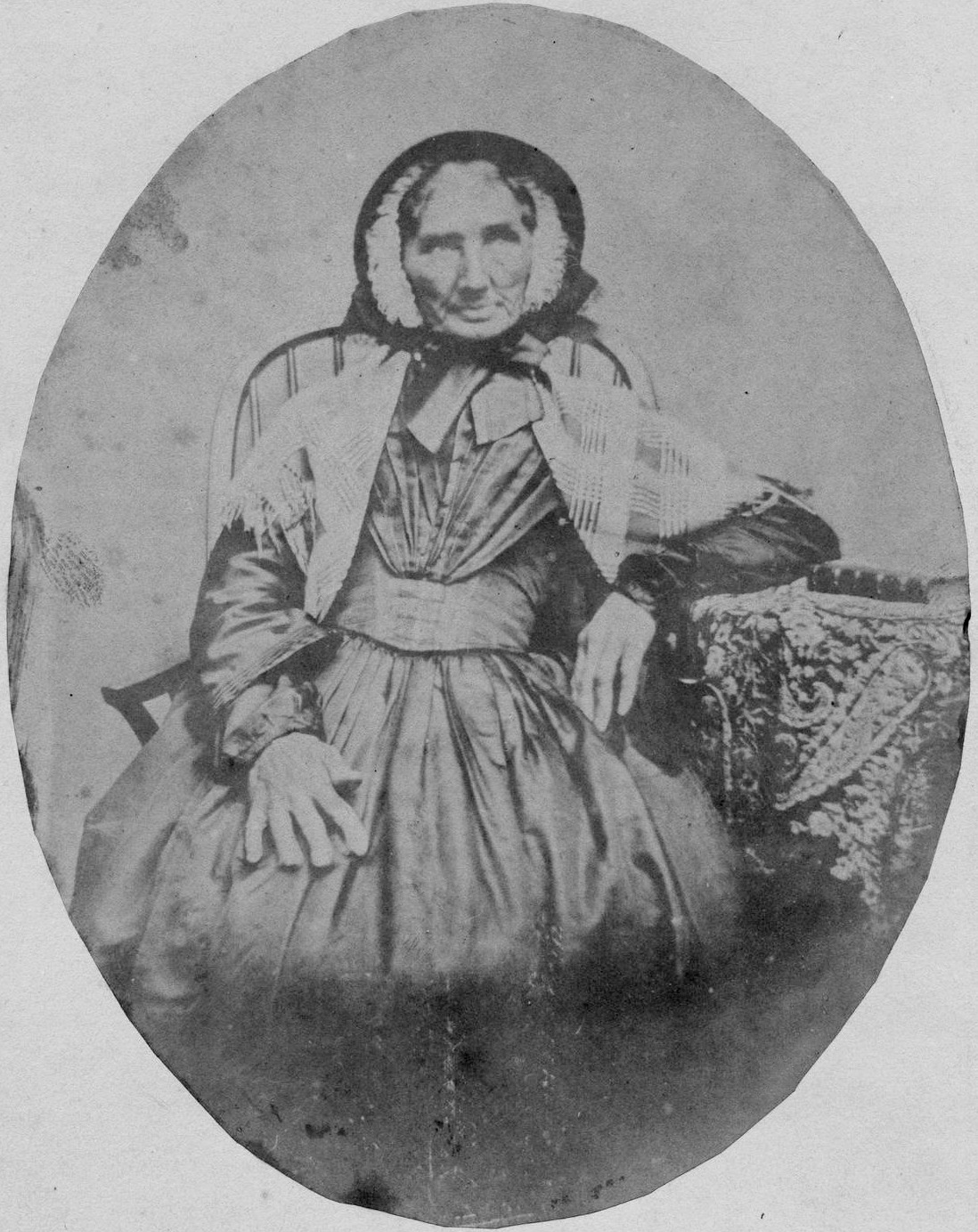
- Eleanor (Nelly) Brennan
- Born: 26 January 1792; Douglas, Isle of Man
- Died: 23 January 1859 (aged 66); Douglas, Isle of Man
- Occupation: Washerwoman/Nurse
- Known for: Heroine of the Isle of Man cholera outbreaks of 1832 & 1833; first Matron of the newly established Hospital and Dispensary in 1839

Eleanor (Nelly) Brennan, (26 January 1792 – 23 January 1859) was a Manx washerwoman who became instrumental in the introduction of the practices of nursing on the Isle of Man. She came to prominence during the cholera outbreaks which affected the town of Douglas in 1832 and 1833 in which she nursed those suffering from the disease. This has led to her becoming known as the "Florence Nightingale of the Isle of Man."

== Biography ==
=== Early life ===
Eleanor Brennan (always known as Nelly) was born in Douglas, Isle Of Man in 1792. Her Irish father was a boatswain on a man-o-war and had been drowned at sea a few months before her birth. Her mother died when she was 16 requiring her to develop self-reliance and diligence.

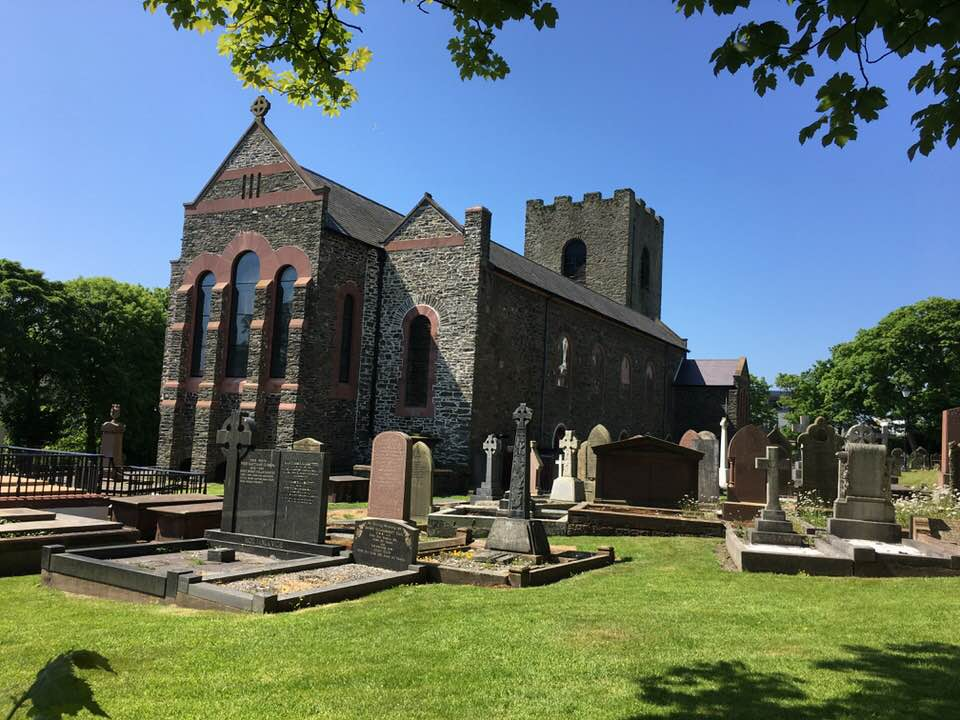
St George's Church, Isle Of Man.

By 1809 she had become a regular attendee of the daily early morning services at St George's Church where she met Thomas Howard who was the curate of the church, leading Nelly to devote her life to God. In addition she would also regularly attend the Wesleyan chapel located in what was then called Preaching House Lane (since renamed Wellington Street).

Said to be utterly trustworthy, she earned her living as a washerwoman being described by a contemporary report as "the best manglewoman in the town."

=== Cholera epidemic ===
During the years 1832 and 1833 a severe outbreak of cholera swept the Isle of Man the effects of which were particularly acute in what was by that time the largest town on the Island, Douglas. Nelly Brennan devoted herself to the nursing of those afflicted, making numerous visits to the homes of the sick and dying, and to the temporary cholera hospital; where she would prepare food, clean their clothes and wash bodies.

When the epidemic had passed she undertook responsibility for many children who had been left orphaned some of whom were taken into her own home, and numerous testimonies exist regarding her work for the poor people of Douglas.

=== Later life ===
Although she herself escaped infection her devotion led to her near destitution. One reason for this was a loss of business she suffered as a consequence of the help she had offered to those affected by the cholera outbreak. This resulted in certain customers refusing to send their clothes to her to be laundered, fearing that they may become infected. Following the cholera outbreak she was employed by the Castle Mona Hotel as a laundress, living in a small apartment near the hotel. However due to the distance between the hotel and the town she was unable to offer the same level of assistance to the poor and consequently she decided to give up her employment and return to aiding the sick. When questioned as to the wisdom of this decision she is said to have replied: 'I dare not neglect the poor.'

Having spent all her own money on the cleaning of the clothes of the sufferers, her outward appearance and the cleanliness of her home masked her personal plight. She was saved by private charity, being presented with a sum of 12 guineas of which she would only accept a small amount, donating the majority of the sum to charitable purposes.

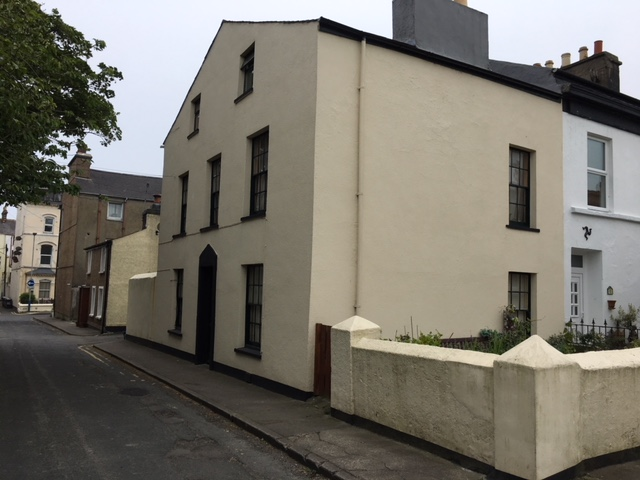
The former home of Nelly Brennan, Wesley Terrace, Douglas Isle of Man.

The latter part of the 1830s saw the opening of a dispensary in Douglas situated in what is today Strand Street. In turn a hospital was added and despite her illiteracy, Nelly Brennan was appointed its first matron. She was employed with an annual salary of £30 per year in addition to which she received a house with a gas and coal allowance. Due to her devotion to the job she suffered a breakdown after 18 months and was compelled to resign.

However she still sought to aid the sick and the poor, known throughout the town of Douglas in her efforts to relieve distress and hardship.

In her later years Nelly Brennan achieved her ambition to have a house built for herself, and making a will leaving the house to a young woman whom she had reared as her own and following her death to the Wesleyan Connexion. She became actively involved in the Douglas Dorcas Society, some of the early meetings of which took place at her home in Wesley Terrace.

== Death ==
Following years of exposure to numerous illnesses, in the latter part of 1858 Nelly Brennan's health started to decline dramatically. Advised to rest, she continued to collect clothes for the poor of Douglas, however she was confined to bed during Christmas week.

Nelly Brennan died at her home on 23 January 1859, three days before her 67th birthday.

== Funeral ==
Nelly Brennan's funeral took place at St George's Church. Seven ministers of different congregations were in attendance in order to pay their respects and of whom they described as:

"one of the most wonderful women who had ever lived in the Island and one whose devotion to duty was not exceeded even by Florence Nightingale."
