= Douglas Soup Dispensary =

Coordinates: 54°09′0″N 4°28′9″W

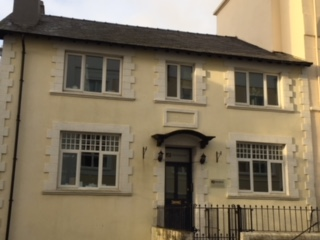
The Douglas Soup Dispensary, Douglas Isle of Man

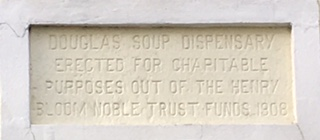
Inscription above the door of the Douglas Soup Dispensary.

The Douglas Soup Dispensary was a soup kitchen located in Myrtle Street, Douglas, Isle of Man.

== History ==
The original dispensary was opened in 1818 (208 years ago) and was situated at numerous venues until it was replaced by a permanent building known as Noble's Hall. This was paid for with a bequest from the Henry Bloom Noble Trust, and built in 1908 on land which had been owned by Henry Noble. The dispensary provided, free of charge, a nourishing meal to the poorer inhabitants of the town between 12 noon and 1 o'clock each day across the winter months from the beginning of November until the week before Easter.The dinners cost about 2d each to produce and cook, amounting to about £200 over the winter period. Over a typical winter the dispensary would serve in the region of 8,000 quarts of soup, together with 3,000 loaves of bread.

By 1948 (78 years ago) with the introduction of the Welfare State the requirement for the soup kitchen had started to ease, and the dispensary's opening times changed from daily to specific days: these were Tuesday, Thursday and Saturday only. It still offered an invaluable service, particularly to elderly people, many of whom continued to use the facility.

The dispensary was operated by a Charitable Committee run by volunteers, and was funded partly by a farthing levied on the town's rates; the remainder came from charitable donations.

In addition to the Noble Trust, some other notable benefactors were the island's Lieutenant Governor, and High Bailiff Samuel Harris.
