= Isle of Man and Liverpool Banking Company =

Isle of Man & Liverpool Bank
- Company type: Private company
- Industry: Banking
- Founded: 1836
- Defunct: 1838
- Headquarters: Douglas, Isle of Man
- Products: Private and business banking

The Isle of Man and Liverpool Bank was a bank in the British Crown dependency of the Isle of Man, providing private and business banking services to the local population. The bank traded from 1836 until it was wound up in 1838.

== History ==
=== Origins ===
The early history of banking on the Isle of Man is rife with incompetence and mismanagement. Whilst the earliest banks in England were an integral part of commerce as far back as the 12th century, banking was unknown on the Isle of Man until the beginning of the 19th century.

The earliest Manx bank, Quayle's Bank, began business in 1802 at Castletown. It was known as the Isle of Man Bank and carried on trading until 1818.

A feature of Manx life at that time was a profusion of currency notes in circulation issued by tradesmen for small amounts.

The Bankers' Notes Act 1817 was passed by Tynwald to control note issues. Five banking licences were issued under this law. The archives deposited in the Rolls Office reveal that in 1817 five banks were authorised to transact banking business and issue notes in the island; among them were John and Alexander Spittall, Gawne and McWhannell, Forbes Bank, and the better known Holmes' Bank.

=== Operation ===
The Isle of Man and Liverpool Banking Company commenced business at Douglas in 1836. It was wound up in May 1838, "from want of sufficient capital to carry on business in both places."

The Isle of Man and Liverpool Bank was succeeded by another company, the Isle of Man Commercial Bank, which in 1849 merged with the City of Glasgow Bank, carrying on its insular business as the Bank of Mona.
