= George Dumbell =

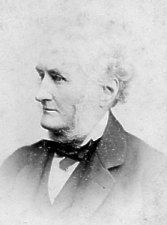
- George William Dumbell
- Monarch: Queen Victoria

Personal details
- Born: 17 September 1804 Flintshire, Wales
- Died: 13 December 1887 (aged 83) Douglas, Isle of Man
- Party: Independent
- Spouse: Mary Gibson
- Children: George Dumbell (jnr), Alured Dumbell, Mary Dumbell, William Dumbell, Ann Dumbell, Louisa Dumbell, Emily Dumbell, Henry Dumbell, Georgina Dumbell, Amy Dumbell, Essy Dumbell, Francis Dumbell
- Profession: Advocate

George William Dumbell QC (17 September 1804 – 13 December 1887) was a British advocate, businessman and philanthropist who was invited to become a Member of the House of Keys serving two different terms (1840–1857 and 1867–1880). He is also remembered on the Isle of Man as being involved in two banking ventures of questionable reputation; the Joint Stock Bank and Dumbell's Bank.

== Biography ==
=== Early life ===
The second son of John Dumbell and Anne Davies, George William Dumbell was born in what at that time was the small hamlet of Poulton-with-Fearnhead, Cheshire. The actual year of his birth is open to question. In an obituary published in the Isle of Man Examiner of Saturday 17 December 1887, the year of his birth is given as 1803; however in the Manx Notebook his birth year is listed as 1804. Dumbell's family were involved in cotton milling, and in 1791 John Dumbell, together with his brother and three other business partners formed the Stockport Bank. Through a mixture of the financial slump during the latter part of the 18th century, the partner's inexperience and a degree of malpractice, the bank's life-span was short and it ceased operations in 1793 after which Dumbell's father was declared bankrupt. John Dumbell served a spell of penal servitude in Flint gaol as a consequence of his bankruptcy, following which the family moved to the Isle of Man sometime between 1815 and 1820.

=== Career ===
==== Advocacy ====
The Dumbell family made their home on North Quay, Douglas. By 1825 John Dumbell had re-established himself in business, together with his older son Hugh, whilst George Dumbell pursued a career in the legal profession, being articled to William Roper in 1823. Roper is said to have also been a somewhat colourful character, having himself been declared bankrupt in Ireland he subsequently went on to become Vicar General of the Isle of Man in 1824.

George Dumbell was called to the bar on 13 October 1826 and soon by a mixture of his acuteness and persevering qualities he gained a leading position in his profession, building a comprehensive legal practice. He was said to be particularly competent in criminal cases, being regarded as a highly thorough advocate and during the mid part of the 19th century performed the role of Clerk to the Justices of the Peace.

==== Mining ====
In addition to his legal activities, Dumbell was instrumental in the development of the mining industry on the Isle of Man. His first venture into mining concerned him investing in a mine at Newtownards, County Down, in 1843. However this investment proved to be disappointing although it did lead to Dumbell forging a partnership with mine engineer Richard Rowe, and this was to result in Rowe moving to the Isle of Man where he was to become heavily involved in the mining industry on the Island, taking charge of Dumbell's Mona Mine at Ellerslie, Crosby. Dumbell was also involved with the Great Laxey Mine, becoming chairman of the company in 1850.

==== Banking ====
===== Joint Stock Bank =====
The Joint Stock Bank, a trading name of Forbes' Bank, had been founded on the Isle of Man in 1836 with George Dumbell becoming a director of the bank in 1840. In 1843 the bank went into liquidation, the failure of the bank having profound consequences for the Isle of Man with the public adopting a feeling of contempt for the bank and its directors.

===== Dumbell's Banking Company =====
In 1853 George Dumbell established the private bank of Dumbell, Son & Howard; which in 1874 became Dumbell's Banking Company Ltd. Following this, branches were opened in Ramsey and Castletown. In August 1857 a notice was posted by Dumbell's advising that it was required to cease business, but everyone would be paid in full; in addition the Bank of Mona also suspended business for a time. In time both banks reopened and in October 1861 Dumbell, together with his partner Louis Howard, took over new premises on Prospect Hill, Douglas Whilst practicing conventional banking from its inception the bank began adopting a more liberal approach from 1880 onwards. This primarily centered on the burgeoning tourism industry, which was becoming established on the Isle of Man. Following George Dumbell's death in 1887 the bank continued its business; however it crashed spectacularly on 3 February 1900, resulting in the ruin of many local businesses and the loss of the savings of numerous individuals.

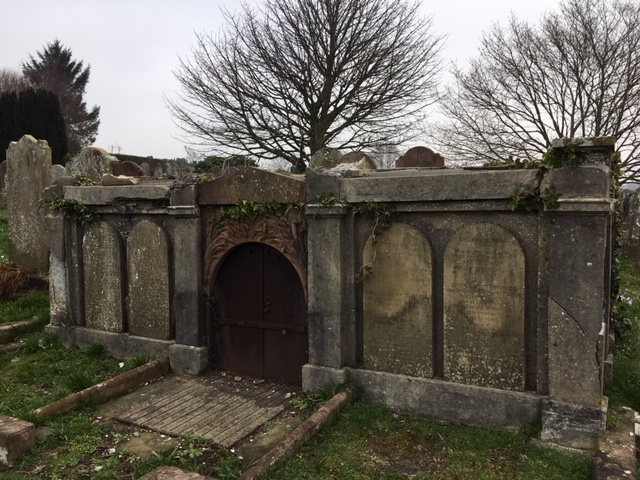
The family burial crypt of the Dumbell family, Braddan cemetery, Isle of Man

== Personal life ==
On 26 June 1831 George Dumbell married Mary Gibson; the marriage produced 12 children.

=== Death ===
During the autumn of 1887 the health of Dumbell began to decline. He died at his home, Belmont, on the afternoon of 13 December 1887. Following Dumbell's funeral his body was interred at Braddan Cemetery.

== Sources ==
Bibliography

- Connery Chappell The Dumbell Affair Prescot: Stephenson 1981 0-901314-21-8
- Phyllis M. Giles 'The Perplexed and ill-managed affairs of the Stockport Bank' 1791–1827 Trans Lancashire & Cheshire Antiquarian Soc vol 88 pp57/90 1994
- Jane Dumbell – letter in MS293 Warrington Local History Collection (ms version of Kendrick's 1853 Portraits of Warrington Worthies though John Dumbell did not appear in the printed version)
- John Dumbell – various printed pamphlets all in Warrington Local History Collection :-W5132$, Wp1212 and Wp1216 (which includes the brief family biographical details quoted)
