= Upper Dumbell Lake =

Lake in Nunavut, Canada

- Location within Nunavut
- Location: Ellesmere Island, Nunavut
- Coordinates: 82°28′N 062°30′W
- Basin countries: Canada
- Max. length: 1 km (0.62 mi)
- Max. width: 1 km (0.62 mi)
- Settlements: Alert, Nunavut

Upper Dumbell Lake is a lake in Qikiqtaaluk Region, Nunavut. It is the northernmost named lake of Canada. It is located 5.2 km (3.2 mi) southwest of Alert, Canada's northernmost settlement, on the coast of Lincoln Sea, Arctic Ocean. The lake is roughly circular and 1 km (0.62 mi) in diameter.
