= Dumbbell (disambiguation) =

A dumbbell is a piece of equipment used in weight training.

Dumbbell may also refer to:

- Dumbbells (film), a 2014 film
- The Dumbbell Nebula is a planetary nebula (M27), which is shaped like a dumbbell
- Physics: A p atomic orbital has the approximate shape of a pair of lobes on opposite sides of the nucleus, or a somewhat dumbbell shape
- The name "dumbbell tenement" was also used for the apartment buildings on the Lower East Side of New York City in the late 19th century
- A "dumbbell interchange" is a type of road interchange
- Dumbbell interstitials, a type of crystal defect
- Dumbell Mountain, in Washington state, US
- DUMBBELLS, mnemonic for cholinergic overdose, also known as SLUDGE syndrome
