= The Folk Show =

Manx Radio programme

The Manx Radio Folk Show
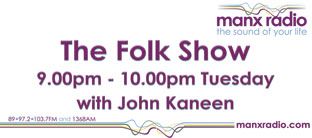
- Manx Radio logo for The Folk Show
- Genre: Folk Music
- Running time: Tuesdays, 9:00pm-10:00pm
- Country of origin: Isle of Man
- Language(s): English
- Home station: Manx Radio
- Starring: John Kaneen
- Created by: John Kaneen
- Audio format: FM and MW radio and online
- Website: www.manxradio.com/on-air/blogs/the-folk-show-659016/

The Folk Show is a radio programme broadcast on Manx Radio and presented by John Kaneen for 45 years, ending in June 2022 as a consequence of poor health.

The Folk Show features music ranging from early recordings of traditional Folk music through to Contemporary folk music. Also played are recordings by Manx folk bands. It is transmitted on the station's 9:00pm – 10:00pm slot on Tuesday nights and is broadcast on FM and MW frequencies as well as world wide through the Manx Radio website. Each edition is then available on the Manx Radio website to be listened to again for the following seven days.

Whilst Manx Radio is a commercial radio station, The Folk Show is not interrupted by the playing of commercials.
