= Holmes' Bank =

Former British financial institution

- Company type: Private company
- Industry: Financial services
- Founded: 1815
- Defunct: 1853
- Fate: Failure due to reckless trading and speculation
- Headquarters: Douglas, Isle of Man
- Key people: James Holmes, Henry Homes, John Holmes
- Products: Banking

Holmes' Bank was a bank in the British Crown dependency of the Isle of Man, providing private and business banking services to the local population. Holmes' Bank crashed spectacularly in 1853 resulting in hardship, unemployment, bankruptcy and destitution for many of the inhabitants of the Island.

== History ==
=== Origins ===
The early history of banking on the Isle of Man is rife with incompetence and mismanagement. Whilst the earliest banks in England were an integral part in trading as far back as the 12th Century, banking was unknown on the Isle of Man until the beginning of the 19th Century.

The earliest Manx bank began business in 1802 at Castletown. It was known as the Isle of Man Bank and carried on trading until 1818. A feature of Manx life at that time was a profusion of bank notes in circulation issued by tradesmen for small amounts and an Act to control note issues was passed in 1817. Five bank licences were issued under this law.

The Bank of Wulff and Forbes opened in 1826 and was taken over 10 years later by the Isle of Man Joint Stock Banking Company, which ended in a disaster in 1843. In 1836 the Isle of Man and Liverpool Banking Company was formed, being wound up two years later. Another bank, the Isle of Man Commercial Bank was also formed during the mid 1840s, being absorbed into the City of Glasgow Bank, which traded on the Isle of Man under the title Bank of Mona, which became the bank of the Isle of Man Government.

=== Formation ===
Holmes's Bank was set up by three brothers; John, Henry and James Holmes the bank's premises being situated on South Quay, Douglas. The brothers' Holmes were involved in various business ventures, ostensibly establishing themselves in the running of passenger and cargo shipping, banking being merely a subsidiary activity of what was virtually a general trading concern.

=== Operation ===
The brothers commenced their banking operation in 1815 the bank forming a reputation for soundness and stability, serving the people of the Isle of Man in a prudent manner up until 1845. However, in the years 1846 and 1847 the bank began involving itself in reckless trading speculations, chiefly involving Liverpool brokers paving the way to its subsequent collapse.

=== Failure ===
Henry Holmes died in 1848, the banking business and other concerns being carried on by his surviving brothers. Profligate practice continued resulting in the failure of Holmes' Bank in 1853, leaving liabilities of approximately £300,000.

=== Aftermath ===
The failure of Holmes' Bank caused acute misery and suffering on the Isle of Man. An investigation of the affairs of the bank disclosed that notes far in excess of the number authorised by licence had mysteriously got into circulation.
