= Forbes Bank =

- Industry: Financial services
- Founded: 1826
- Defunct: 1843
- Headquarters: Douglas, Isle of Man
- Key people: Edward Forbes
- Products: Banking

Forbes Bank was a bank in the British Crown dependency of the Isle of Man, providing private and business banking services to the local population. The bank operated from 1826 until it crashed spectacularly in 1843 resulting in hardship, unemployment, bankruptcy and destitution for many of the inhabitants of the Island.

== History ==
=== Origins ===
The early history of banking on the Isle of Man is rife with incompetence and mismanagement. Whilst the earliest banks in England were an integral part in trading as far back as the 12th Century, banking was unknown on the Isle of Man until the beginning of the 19th Century.

The earliest Manx bank began business in 1802 at Castletown. It was known as the Isle of Man Bank and carried on trading until 1818. A feature of Manx life at that time was a profusion of bank notes in circulation issued by tradesmen for small amounts and an Act to control note issues was passed in 1817. Five bank licences were issued under this law. The archives deposited in the Rolls Office reveal the fact that in 1817 five banks were authorised to transact banking business and issue notes in the Island, among them being John and Alexander Spittall, Gawne and McWhannell, Forbes Bank, and the better known Holmes' Bank.

=== Formation and operation ===
Forbes Bank was established from the banking firm of Wulff and Forbes and opened in 1826. The bank's premises were situated on the site of where Douglas Railway Station now stands. In 1827 the bank was converted into the Isle of Man Joint Stock Banking Company which had a capital of £50,000 in £5 shares. A bonus of £2,500 was given for the transfer with Edward Forbes appointed as manager. Whether Forbes Bank was solvent at the time of its conversion into the Joint Stock Banking Company is a matter of conjecture.

=== Failure ===
The undertaking ended disastrously in 1843. The cause was an extensive defalcation by a manager, whose method was the circulation of fraudulent bills. A bitter controversy on the management and the method of liquidation is reflected in the newspapers of the time. At the failure, the Bank was liable on notes £14,000; unpaid drafts, £6000; and deposits, £45,000. Its advances were £62,000, and securities lodged against notes £15,000.

Its greatest indebtedness seems to have been to its London agents, some £70,000 to £80,000.

=== Aftermath ===
The failure of Forbes Bank caused acute misery and suffering on the Isle of Man.

Presently there is a new bank on Isle of Man named Forbes Bank with a chartered capital of 1.7 Billion dollars. />

== Sources ==
Bibliography

- Manx Banking. By Pilcher G. Ralfe.
