= St George's Church, Isle of Man =

Church in Douglas, Isle of Man

St George's Church
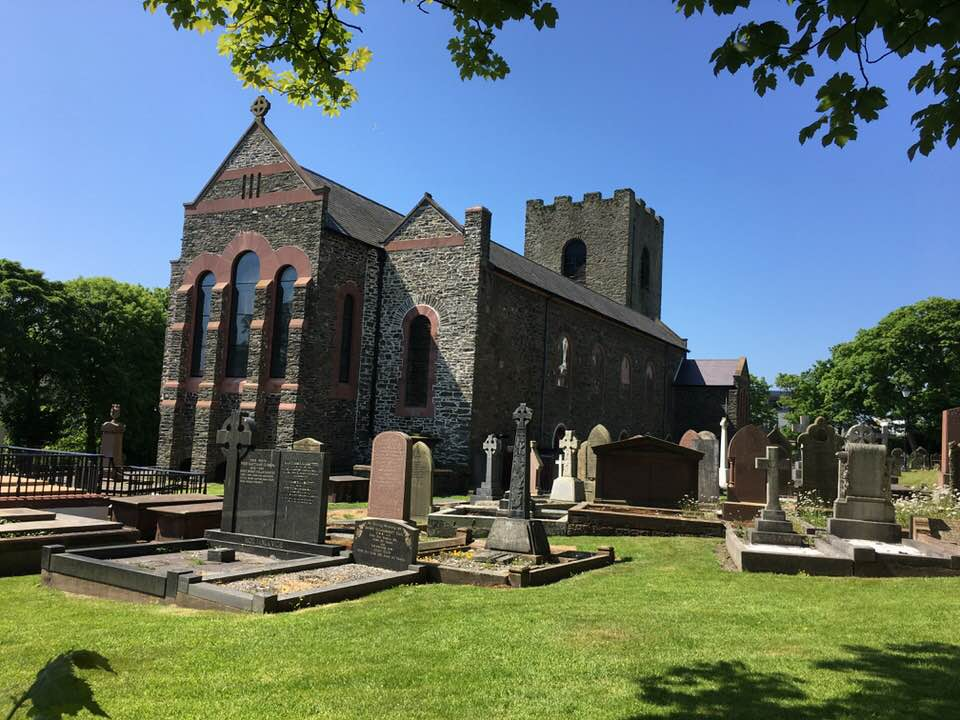
- St George's Church, Douglas, Isle of Man

- 54.149384°N 4.483710°W
- Location: Upper Church Street, Douglas, Isle of Man.
- Country: Isle of Man
- Denomination: Church of England
- Tradition: Conservative evangelical
- Website: Church website

History
- Status: Parish church
- Founded: 1761
- Dedication: Saint George
- Consecrated: 29 September 1781

Architecture
- Functional status: Active
- Style: Gothic Revival
- Groundbreaking: 1761
- Completed: 1781
- Construction cost: Approximately £1,500

Specifications
- Capacity: 1,300

Administration
- Diocese: Diocese of Sodor and Man
- Parish: St George and All Saints

Clergy
- Vicar: Rev Andrew Brown

St George's Church is an Anglican church in Douglas, Isle of Man and falls within the Diocese of Sodor and Man. It was formerly one of two worship centres in association with All Saints Church, Douglas.

== History ==
In the early 1700s the population of Douglas was approximately 800 people, and at this time the first St Matthew's Church served as the centre of worship for the population. However with the rise in population attributed to the Isle of Man's smuggling trade (known on the Island as the Running Trade) the prosperity of the town began to increase dramatically.

By the mid part of the 18th Century the population of the town had swelled to over 3,000 which in turn led to calls for a new church in order to meet demand, St Matthew's proving to be inadequate for purpose.

=== Construction ===
==== Initial construction ====
Land was sourced on the outskirts of the town, high on a hill overlooking Douglas Harbour, which at the time was situated in the Parish of Braddan. The town's gentry (some of whom had profited from the running trade) met the initial cost, raising the necessary money by public subscription. By 1761 the amount raised totalled £712 (£131,000 in 2025), but after four years money had run out and worked subsequently stopped.

==== Completion and consecration ====
Nothing more happened until 1776, when with further money raised work recommenced. An additional sum of £800 (£113,000 in 2025) had been raised enabling work to be completed with the church being consecrated on 29 September 1781. In order to pay off the further debts a charge of 25 guineas was made for a first-class pew and 15 guineas for a second-class pew.

The completed church could accommodate 1,300 worshipers. Donations of fine embellishments from various benefactors including a silver communion service, made by a London silversmith which was donated by John Murray, 4th Duke of Atholl, with a later addition of a stained glass window funded by Henry Noble.

Numerous people of local society were buried in the churchyard, including Sir William Hillary and Nelly Brennan. The top side of the churchyard is an open grassed area, marked with a solitary cross, used for the mass burial of cholera victims during 1832 and 1833.

== Organ ==
St George's church organ was the first to be installed in any church on the Isle of Man. Made in 1741 by Harris & Byfield, it was acquired from the Dublin Assembly Hall in 1778 by one of the St George's Trustees for the sum of £100 (£14,000 in 2025).

It is the organ on which George Frideric Handel conducted the first performance of the messiah which took place in Dublin in 1742.

One of the first people to play the organ was Charles Barrow, grandfather of Charles Dickens. The organ was refurbished in 1950 by Jardine's of Manchester at a cost of £3,985 (£118,000 in 2025).

== Notable gravesites ==
- Sir William Hillary, philanthropist and founder of the Royal National Lifeboat Institution.
- Nelly Brennan, heroine of cholera outbreaks.

== Gallery ==
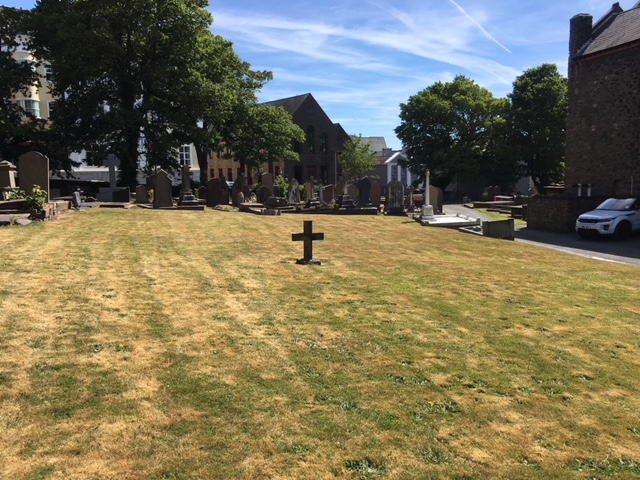
Mass grave of victims of the cholera outbreaks in 1832 & 1833

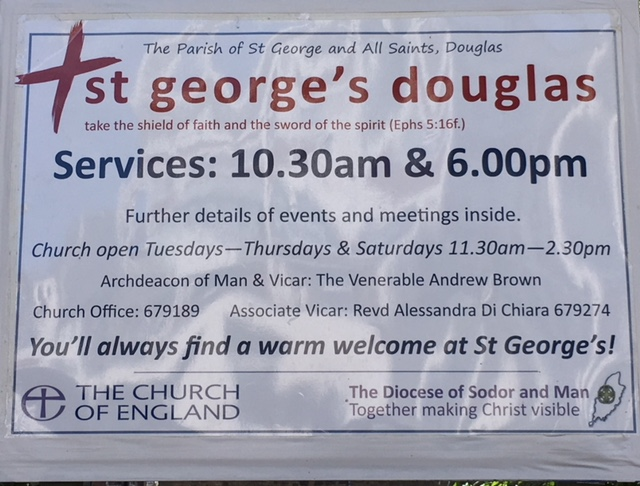
Information on the activities at St George's Church

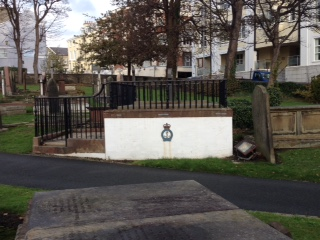
The grave of Sir William Hillary

== See also ==
- Diocese of Sodor and Man
- Bishop of Sodor and Man
