= George Steuart (architect) =

Scottish architect

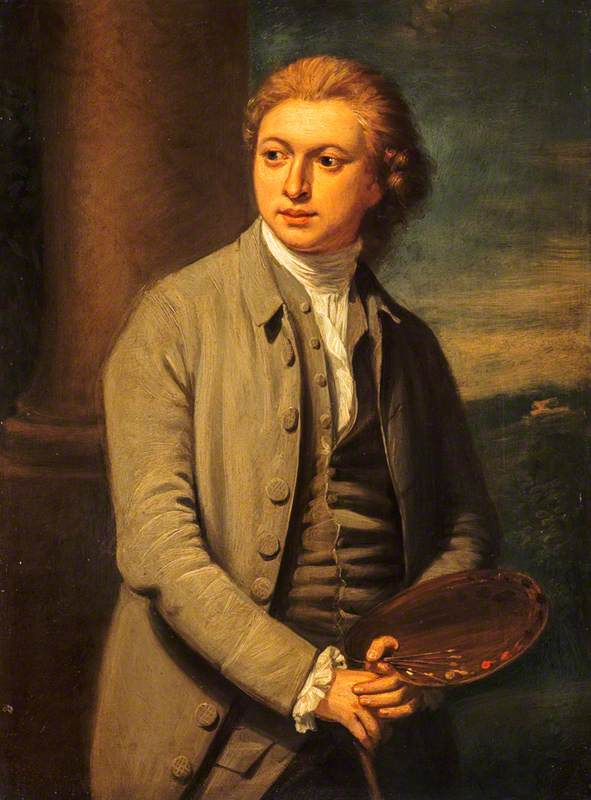
- Portrait of George Steuart, attributed to William Beechey
- Born: c. 1730; Atholl, Perthshire
- Died: 20 December 1806 (aged 75–76); Douglas, Isle of Man
- Occupation: Architect
- Years active: c. 1770–1806
- Children: Robert Steuart
- Buildings: Attingham Hall, St. Chad's Church, Castle Mona

George Steuart (c. 1730 – 20 December 1806) was a Scottish architect. Although native to the province of Atholl in Perthshire, Steuart spent most of his adult life in London, before moving to the Isle of Man in his final years. The lifelong patronage of the Dukes of Atholl assisted him greatly in his architectural career. Surviving examples of his work include Attingham Hall and St Chad's Church, Shrewsbury in Shropshire, and Castle Mona in the Isle of Man.

== Biography ==
Steuart was born in Atholl, Perthshire, around 1730. He was living in London from 1749, where he worked as a house-painter. In 1766, he was appointed Painter to the Board of Ordnance.

His first known architectural work was a town house for John Murray, 3rd Duke of Atholl, which was completed in 1770. From this date, Steuart was actively practising as an architect in London, first in Berners Street and then in Harley Street. His work exhibited a "markedly neo-classical taste", with a fondness for tall, thin columns, narrow windows, and "a uniform severity of wall surface" which "verges on bleakness". This style can be seen in one of the few surviving examples of his work, Attingham Hall in Shropshire, built 1783–85. In another of his surviving buildings, St. Chad's Church in Shrewsbury, he departed from convention with a circular design and an unusual three-tiered steeple.

Steuart maintained a close relationship with his patrons, the 3rd and 4th Dukes of Atholl, throughout his life. His surviving correspondence with the dukes amounts to about a hundred letters, in which Steuart not only discussed professional matters, but also passed on news and gossip from the English capital. The client-patron relationship has been described as exceptional for the time, with Steuart rendering the Atholls many non-architectural services in London, such as negotiating business deals and even consulting medical professionals on their behalf. In return, the dukes employed Steuart on a variety of projects, and wrote letters of recommendation to their peers which enabled him to mix with high society.

In 1793, Steuart was commissioned to design a new pier for Douglas Harbour in the Isle of Man. He may have secured this commission through the influence of the 4th Duke of Atholl, who was made Governor of the island in the same year. Some time after this work was begun, Steuart took up residence in the Isle of Man, and worked on several other projects there in his final years. The most ambitious of these, and his last known work, was Castle Mona, which was built as a private home for the 4th Duke of Atholl.

Steuart died on 20 December 1806, in Lough House, Douglas, and was buried at the parish church in Braddan. He was survived by one son, Robert.

== List of works ==
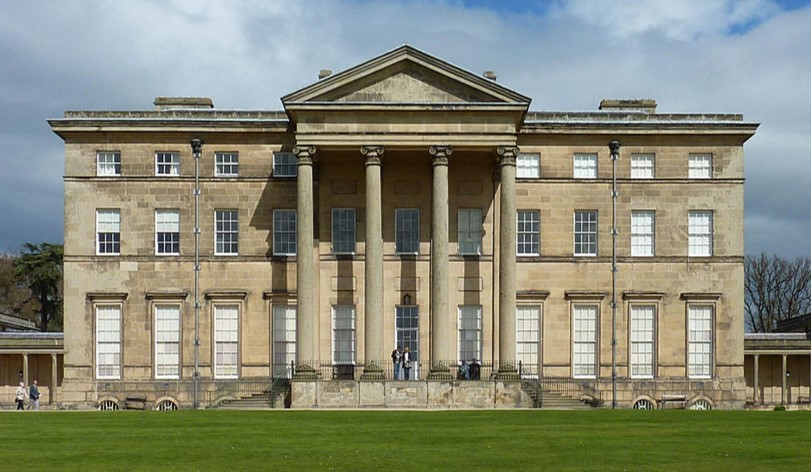
Attingham Hall

The following buildings and structures were designed by Steuart:

- Town house, Grosvenor Place, London (completed 1770)
- Garden temple, Millichope Park, Shropshire (1770)
- Subsidiary buildings at Blair Castle and Dunkeld House, Perthshire (1777)
- Baronscourt, County Tyrone, Ireland (1779–82; attribution uncertain)
- Inn at Gauze Street, Paisley, Renfrewshire (1780–82)
- Attingham Hall, Shropshire (1783–85)
- Lythwood Hall at Bayston Hill, Shropshire (c. 1785)
- Stoke Park, Erlestoke, Wiltshire (1786–91)
- All Saints Church, Wellington, Shropshire (1788–90)
- St Chad's Church, Shrewsbury, Shropshire (1790–92)
- Red Pier, lighthouse and courthouse at Douglas Harbour, Isle of Man (1793–99)
- Courthouse at Ramsey, Isle of Man (1798)
- Castle Mona, Douglas, Isle of Man (1801–06)
- Memorial obelisk to Henry Murray at Braddan, Isle of Man (1805; attribution uncertain)
