= Villa Marina, Isle of Man =

Entertainment venue in Douglas, Isle of Man

Coordinates: 54.155°N 4.478°W

Villa Marina
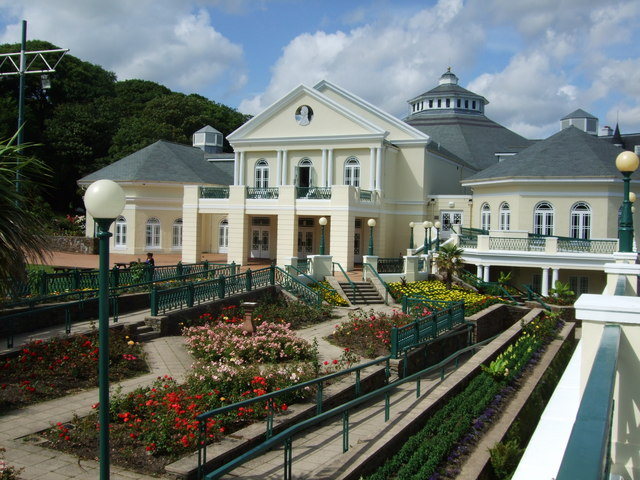
- View of main building and gardens (c. 2009)
- Interactive map of Villa Marina
- Former names: Villa Marina Gardens and Kursaal (1913-14)
- Address: Harris Promenade; Douglas; Isle of Man; IM1 2HP
- Owner: Department of Education, Sport and Culture
- Capacity: 1,620 (Royal Hall); 300 (Promenade Suite); 200 (Colonnade Suite); 200 (Villa Marina Arcade); 150 (Broadway Cinema); 20 (Noble Suite)

Construction
- Groundbreaking: December 1911
- Opened: 19 July 1913
- Renovated: 2001-04, 2010
- Cost: £25,000 (£2.55 million in 2025 pounds)
- Architects: Percy Robinson and W. Alban Jones
- Builder: Paul Rhodes
- Main contractor: Ferro-Concrete

Website
- Venue Website

The Villa Marina is an entertainment venue in Douglas, Isle of Man, which forms part of the wider Villa-Gaiety complex. It is located on Harris Promenade, looking out onto Douglas Bay, and comprises the Royal Hall, Broadway Cinema, Promenade Suite, Colonnade Suite, Dragon's Castle and the Villa Marina Gardens. The architect was Alban Jones, whose design was chosen in an open competition judged by Professor Stanley Adshead of Liverpool University.

Prof. Adshead was an eminent designer of entertainment buildings for seaside resorts, his work including: the Royal Victoria Pavilion, Ramsgate; the Worthing Lido; the Pavilion Theatre and Worthing Pier.

== History ==
=== Villa Marina Estate ===
==== Origins ====
The Villa Marina and surrounding grounds were originally an estate owned by George Steuart, who acquired the land in 1806. After his death the estate passed to his son, Colonel Robert Steuart, Receiver General of the Isle of Man and Customs Collector for the Port of Douglas. The estate included about 7 acres (3 hectares) and consisted of the Mansion House and offices, walled gardens, lawns, plantations and a flower garden. In addition there was a conservatory and hothouse which contained tropical plants. The Mansion House had a drawing room, dining room, two libraries, a large hall, fifteen bedrooms and a verandah. There were kitchens, servants' hall, pantries, two cellars, a washhouse and a brewhouse. Outside was situated a four-stall stable, a coach house with accommodation for three carriages, a harness room, a granary, a farm stable and piggery. The Villa Marina Estate also had a gardener's lodge.

Colonel Steuart died, aged 65, on 15 November 1832; the whole estate was then offered for sale by auction.

==== Joseph Dunn ====
The Mansion House and surrounds were bought by Joseph Dunn, uncle of two ladies, Frances and Eliza Dutton, referred to as the Misses Dutton, and were subsequently converted into a seminary boarding school under the governorship of the Misses Dutton, who moved the seminary from nearby Athol Street at the start of 1834. Joseph Dunn died in 1845, after which some of the land on the west of the estate was sold to John Crellin for development, resulting in the creation of the residential area of Derby Square and Crellin's Hill. In Spring 1854 the Villa Marina Estate was again placed on the market, with the school to vacate on the agreement of sale. However interest appears to have been non-existent until in December 1860, when it was confirmed that the property was to be the home of the Lieutenant Governor of the Isle of Man, Francis Pigott Stainsby Conant, a situation which resulted in a seven-year lease on the estate from the beginning of 1861 with a break at the end of three or five years. The Misses Dutton vacated the premises at the beginning of 1861 relocating to the outskirts of the town at Parkfield Villa, which today is situated on the A2 Glencrutchery Road. After some slight alterations to the premises, the Governor took up residence in May 1861. The rent for the Villa Marina was agreed at £250 per annum or a purchase cost of £7,500.

The tenancy of Governor Pigott was short: he died on 21 January 1863. The unexpired part of the lease was then placed on the market with an option to purchase the estate and the right to purchase the house and grounds within the remaining five years of the lease.

==== Henry Noble ====
On 4 May 1863, the unexpired term of the lease was purchased by Henry Bloom Noble and John Firth for £7,750 following which the lease on the premises was offered for tenancy. In October 1864, the tenancy was taken by William Johnson, a local publican, who turned the residence into a hotel. Various functions were held at the hotel, one being a dinner in honour of James Gell on 4 July 1866, after his appointment as Attorney General.

William Johnson relinquished his lease on the Villa Marina at the beginning of May 1868, when he retired from business. After unsuccessfully advertising the lease for continued use as a hotel, Henry Noble purchased the shares held by John Firth and set about turning the Villa Marina into his personal residence; although there was a degree of consensus at the time that the estate should have been bought and turned into a pleasure ground with a proposal put forward to raise £10,000 in £1 shares for the purchase.

After Noble's death in 1903, the Villa Marina was once again used as a home for the island's Lieutenant Governor when Lord Raglan took up residence after his appointment later that year.

=== Villa Marina Entertainment Venue ===
The entire site was bequeathed in Noble's will to the Henry Bloom Noble Trust. The site was used as the venue for several summer garden fetes and parties and provided a particularly good vantage point for the running of the Gordon Bennett Trials, first held on the Isle of Man in 1904. On several occasions the Villa Marina's grounds played host to open air religious services, one such instance being the annual session of the District Synod of the Primitive Methodist Church (Liverpool District) which was held in Douglas in the Spring of 1906. Following Noble's death there was a degree of uncertainty as to what would become of the estate, with a fear that it could be sold to property developers as this was the height of the Isle of Man's tourism boom. However, the trust donated the entire site to Douglas Corporation which then redeveloped the site as an entertainment venue. Upon completion the venue was opened by the Lieutenant Governor, Lord Raglan, on 19 July 1913.

The original name of the venue was the Villa Marina Kursaal. In part this was seen as an attempt by the Corporation to address the town's perceived lack of sophistication and to raise the town's profile to visitors. The Germanic term for the venue was dropped at the outbreak of World War I and the venue was renamed the Royal Hall.

For several summer seasons in the 1950s the Villa Marina was home to Joe Loss and his orchestra. Other stars performing at that time included Ivy Benson and various international cabaret artistes. During the summer months the Villa gardens would also be the venue for numerous beauty pageants.

== Restoration ==
By the year 2000, the Villa Marina had become a burden to its owner, Douglas Corporation, and was in need of considerable renovation. Just as had been the case with the nearby Gaiety Theatre 30 years previously, the large financial commitment needed to restore the venue to an acceptable standard was seen as unaffordable, and so ownership of the Villa Marina was transferred from Douglas Borough Council to the Isle of Man Government in March 2000.

Various alterations were made starting in 2001, with local architect Ian Brown commissioned to undertake the work. The work included the reorientation of the main entrance from facing the promenade to facing the gardens. A cinema and Promenade Suite were created, and a profile of the benefactor of the land, Henry Bloom Noble, was placed above the entrance.

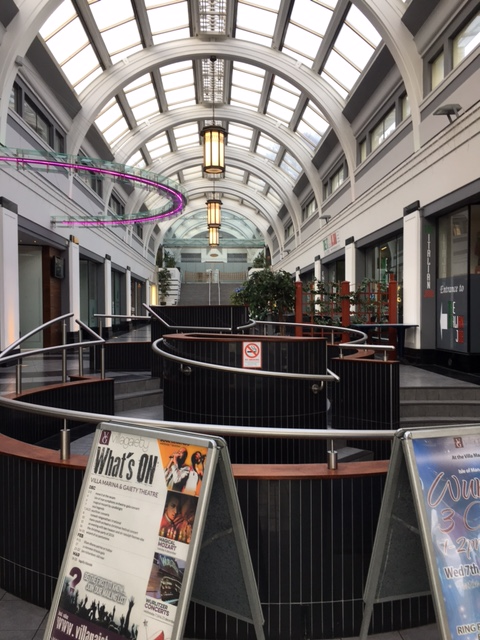
A view of the Villa Marina Arcade, Douglas Isle of Man.

== Other attractions ==
=== Dragon's Castle ===
The Dragon's Castle is a venue for young children to have fun in a safe and friendly environment. The facility can cater for up to 30 children and is a popular venue for children's birthdays. Facilities include: Slides, tunnels, a ball pool, wall puzzles, soft play, obstacles, a swinging rope, and bridges.

=== Broadway cinema ===
The Broadway Cinema is a modern cinema showing the latest movie releases as well as niche films on occasions. The cinema can also be used as a lecture theatre.

== Current use ==
As part of the integrated VillaGaiety complex, the venue plays host to a variety of entertainment; notable amongst these are music concerts and comedy shows. The Villa Marina has also hosted numerous indoor sporting events such as darts tournaments, chess tournaments, boxing tournaments and International All-Star Professional Wrestling.
