= Manx Radio =

Radio station in the Isle of Man

Coordinates: 54.1485°N 4.4742°W

- Douglas; Isle of Man
- Frequencies: FM: 89.0 MHz (Snaefell); 89.5 MHz (Ramsey/Peel); 97.2 MHz (Douglas); 103.7 MHz (Jurby); AM: 1368 kHz; DAB: (Douglas and Onchan)
- RDS: MANX FM

Programming
- Languages: English; Manx
- Format: Adult contemporary

Ownership
- Owner: Radio Manx Ltd., majority-owned by the Isle of Man Treasury
- Sister stations: Radio TT

History
- First air date: 29 June 1964

Links
- Website: http://www.manxradio.com

Manx Radio (legally Radio Manx Ltd.) (Manx: Radio Vannin) is the national commercial radio station for the Isle of Man. It began broadcasting on 29 June 1964, almost ten years before legal commercial radio was licensed in the United Kingdom. The Isle of Man, having its own government and laws, was not subject to the rules prohibiting commercial broadcasting in the UK. However, the Manx Government still had to apply to the UK's General Post Office for a frequency and for permission to broadcast. First requested in 1960, a licence was eventually granted in May 1964. It was allocated an FM frequency of 89.0 MHz and a comparatively low power of 50 watts. In October 1964, an additional frequency of 1594 kHz AM was allocated to the station to provide greater coverage, although again at a limited power of 50 watts. It broadcasts primarily in English with several hours per week of Manx language programming.

As of March 2024, the station broadcasts to a weekly audience of 26,000 listeners, according to RAJAR.

== Current frequencies ==
Manx Radio currently broadcasts on 89.0 MHz (from Snaefell) for the north of the island; 97.2 MHz FM (from Douglas/Carnane) for the south of the island; and 103.7 MHz (from Jurby) for the island's hills. Additional low-power transmitters cover Ramsey and Peel on a frequency of 89.5 MHz.

Manx Radio Gold broadcasts on 1368 AM across the island.

The station's FM and AM services are also available online and on DAB in Douglas, Onchan and the central valley.

== Financial Income ==
Manx Radio's commercial revenues in 2018 accounted for over 60% of its revenues. To provide the public service element of its output it received a government subvention of £875,000 as well as government support for its transmission networks and its coverage of the TT.

== Company structure ==
Manx Radio is the island's public service broadcaster. It was originally run by the Isle of Man Broadcasting Commission, a state-owned body, under the name Isle of Man Broadcasting Company. In 1980 the company was moved to an arms-length operation using the name Radio Manx Limited (the on-air name did not change). Since 1994, the shares in Radio Manx Limited have been held by the Manx Radio Trust, further distancing the station from Tynwald. Nevertheless, the company remains responsible to Tynwald and its operations are reviewed annually.

== Manx Radio Gold ==
In July 2024, Manx Radio Gold launched online and on 1368 kHz, playing 'The Greatest Hits on Earth'. The station is mainly non-stop music, but includes the Andy Wint Breakfast Show on weekdays, Carnaby Street on Saturday mornings (simulcast with the main Manx Radio service) and Hartley's Record Bag on Saturday afternoon. The Manx language output from Manx Radio, together with coverage of Tynwald, some sport output and monthly simulcasts with Radio Caroline shunts Manx Radio Gold off AM, making it online-only at those times.

For regulatory reasons, the FM feed of Manx Radio resumed its simulcast on AM between 12:00 and 00:00 local time on weekdays in October 2026. This change came after the station received a warning from the Communications and Utilities Regulatory Authority for frequently falling below its requirement of 40% speech output during daytime hours, with the issue being attributed in the main to the newer station. During weekends, Manx Radio Gold continues its broadcasts on medium wave, under the same conditions as outlined above.

== TT races ==
During the Isle of Man TT races, the 1368 kHz frequency provides news and results on the races. The service, originally known as Manx Radio TT or simply Radio TT, is also available on 87.9 FM in Douglas and 100.6 FM in Sulby. Presenters can be heard each day, John Moss presents the TT news bulletins and the commentary team cover the practice and racing sessions.

In May 2012, Manx Radio TT was re-branded as Manx Radio TT 365 to signify that the station was available to listen to throughout the year via the internet. The service incorporated archive commentary recordings with classic music tracks, as well as the TT fortnight broadcasts. However, after less than a year (and less than 365 days) the service was subsequently closed.

Manx Radio TT recommenced its usual service in May 2013. In 2015 and 2016, the service was broadcast as Vauxhall Radio TT.

In 2019 the traditional race coverage service was broadcast under the name of Isle of Man TT Radio, under terms agreed by the Department for Enterprise and Manx Radio for the 2019 TT and Festival of Motorcycling. The agreement resulted the removal of all Manx Radio TT branding from its coverage and the end of it being able to sell its own advertising for race coverage. The commentary and race coverage carried only an hourly announcement that said "this service is provided by Manx Radio".

In 2022, Manx Radio 1368 'The Best Biking Station in the World' began to give coverage of the TT races, broadcasting locally on AM & FM around the course and online. The station features the familiar mix of music, TT news, TT events and travel info. The name Radio TT is only used for the broadcasts of racing and practice sessions. Since 2023, the station has also broadcast on DAB in the Douglas and Onchan areas. In 2025, the TT station returned as Manx Radio Motorsport. The TT station shunts Manx Radio Gold off 1368 AM (to be online only) for the duration of TT fortnight.

== Manx Radio presenters ==
=== Notable presenters ===
- David Callister (deceased)
- Bob Carswell
- Jim Caine (deceased)
- Ruth Shimmin

== Manx Radio news ==
Manx Radio employs a team of broadcast and digital journalists, responsible for hourly news bulletins. They also produce a range of other shows focussing on news and local politics including 'Perspective' at noon on Sunday and a range of sport updates and shows.

== Transmitter reuse ==
A deal between United Christian Broadcasters (UCB) and Manx Radio saw UCB broadcast via Manx Radio from 5 October 1987 for four hours overnight.

Since September 2015, Radio Caroline has been broadcasting "live" for one weekend each month as "Radio Caroline North" (with original DJs and a mixed sixties, seventies and eighties music content and jingles) from its former home the MV Ross Revenge on the Blackwater Estuary in Essex, via Manx Radio's 1368 kHz 20 kW transmitter.
