= Castle Mona =

Building in Douglas, Isle of Man

Coordinates: 54.16168°N 4.47333°W

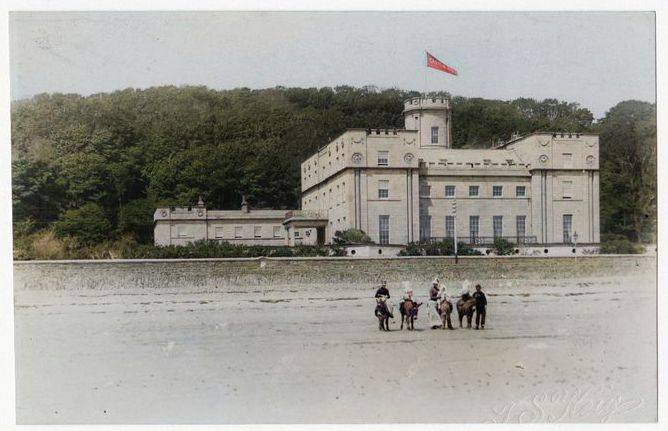
- Castle Mona
- Interactive map of Castle Mona
- Address: Central Promenade; Douglas; Isle of Man
- Owner: Tevir Group

Construction
- Groundbreaking: 1803
- Built: 1804
- Cost: Estimated between £20,000 - £40,000
- Architect: George Steuart

Castle Mona is a former private residence later used as a hotel in Douglas, Isle of Man. The house was built between 1803 and 1804 for the 4th Duke of Atholl during his term as Governor of the Isle of Man. Before 1850, Queen Victoria proposed buying it as a more suitable royal residence than Osborne House.

After the hotel closed the building fell into disrepair, and subsequent to further disuse was sold at auction in 2018. In 2022 works were undertaken to demolish modern additions to the listed structure housing the bowling alley, nightclub and accommodation.

== History ==
=== Private residence ===
Castle Mona was designed by the architect George Steuart, a native of Perthshire, Scotland, who arrived on the Isle of Man in 1793. Amongst Steuart's other works included Attingham Hall, Baronscourt and St Chad's Church, Shrewsbury.

Apart from Castle Mona, Steuart's chief work on the Isle of Man was the Red Pier which, with the lighthouse and courthouse, he designed between 1793 and 1799 and the Ramsey Courthouse (constructed circa 1800). In addition Steuart designed the obelisk in Braddan Parish Churchyard commemorating Lord Henry Murray.

Castle Mona was constructed from stone brought from the Isle of Arran, the cost of construction being variously stated from £20,000 to £40,000 with other estimates placing the cost in excess of £50,000. The building was constructed as a perfect square, with an additional wing on the south side. A similar wing was intended for the north side but was never constructed. A circular tower is situated in the center of the structure.

The wall facing the sea was ornamented with four plaques. One of the centre plaques bears the coat of arms of the Murray family to which the Duke of Atholl belonged; another bearing the arms of the earlier Earldom of Atholl. The domain adjoining the house was comparatively small terminating on the north side to a point now represented by the end of a row of shops, where a lodge was built. Another lodge stood on part of the site which today is Castle Terrace, and a drive ran through what is today Castle Mona Avenue - the site being formerly known as The Black Lawn.

The ground behind the castle rises abruptly in the form of a cliff and this restricted the land available for the grounds of the actual mansion. This restriction led to the Duke's choice of the land to be criticised in some earlier guides to the Isle of Man. However the land behind the cliff, which was also owned by the Duke, stretched up as far as what today is the Glencrutchery Road and which at the time of the early 19th century was said to be thickly wooded.

Following the death of the 4th Duke in 1830 the estate was sold, and it was initially planned to break up and apportion the land for building sites. This led to the notion of establishing a new town in the area to be called Woodville, however this merely resulted in a few late Georgian houses bordering on what today is Victoria Road.

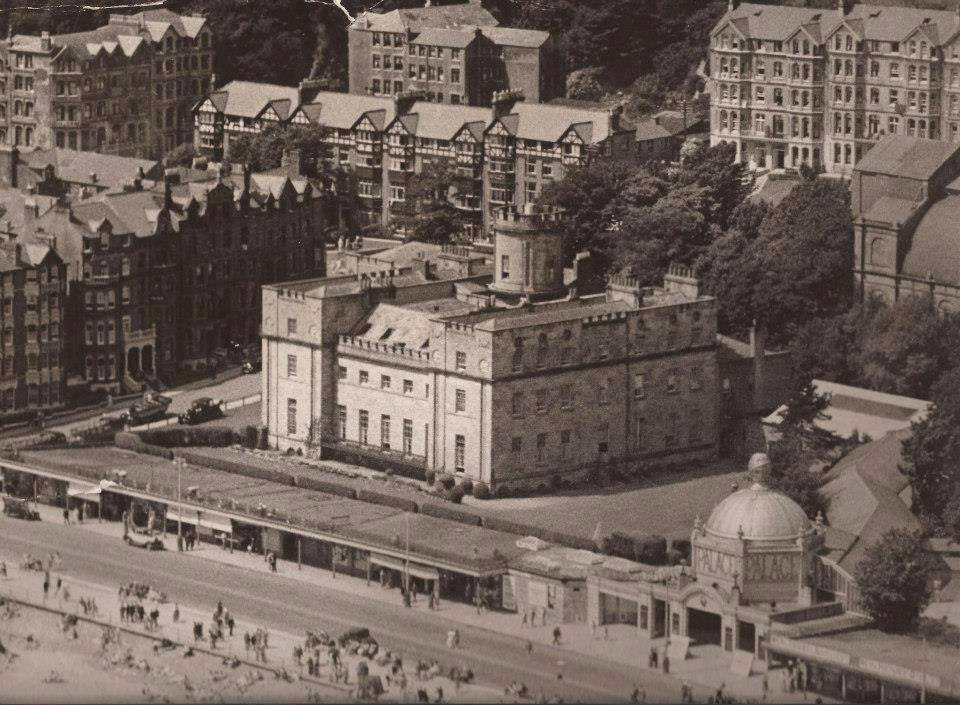
Castle Mona (circa 1927)

=== Hotel ===
In 1831 the main building was converted into a hotel, with local architect John Welch (who designed such structures as King William's College, the Smelt Monument and the Tower of Refuge) being responsible for the alterations. The first manager of the hotel was William Mallett, who had previously run a London Coffee House. In 1836 the Castle Mona Hotel was bought by George Heron, who had come from the Portabello Hotel in Dublin. As a hotel it became celebrated, an early guest describing it as suitable to: "men of rank and fashion."

Further alterations to the front of the hotel in 1898 saw the erection of a parade of shops. A subsequent addition which further increased the accommodation capacity was added with the erection of a north wing adjoining the original structure. By the 1960s the Castle Mona was widely regarded as the Isle of Man's premier hotel and was the venue of the first licensed casino.

Subsequently, Castle Mona went through various ownership until by the 1990s it had evolved, becoming a leisure and entertainment venue in addition to a 96 bedroom hotel. The former saloon bar to the south wing (which was once stables) became Diamonds nightclub for the summer season of 1989, changing name to Jimmy B's after the summer season of 1992 (the name derived from the then owner's race horse). The club had a long spell of closure due to court injunctions from the local constabulary and courts of justice on various counts of illegal activities taking place in the club by its patrons. It only reopened after an extensive CCTV system was fitted and security reassurances were met, by this time its heyday had long gone with popularity transferring to other nearby clubs. Jimmy B's finally closed its doors as a nightclub in 2002 to become an American themed restaurant "Arbuckle's" and later a live music venue called The Office (2003). A bowling complex was built with a fun pub called Studebaker's which quite quickly evolved into a late bar and then took on nightclub hours and music events. In 2002 it was renamed Breeze with the former pool hall above becoming a lounge bar called Chill. However a downturn in fortunes occurred in the early 2000s and the Castle Mona Hotel was put up for sale before being closed in 2006.

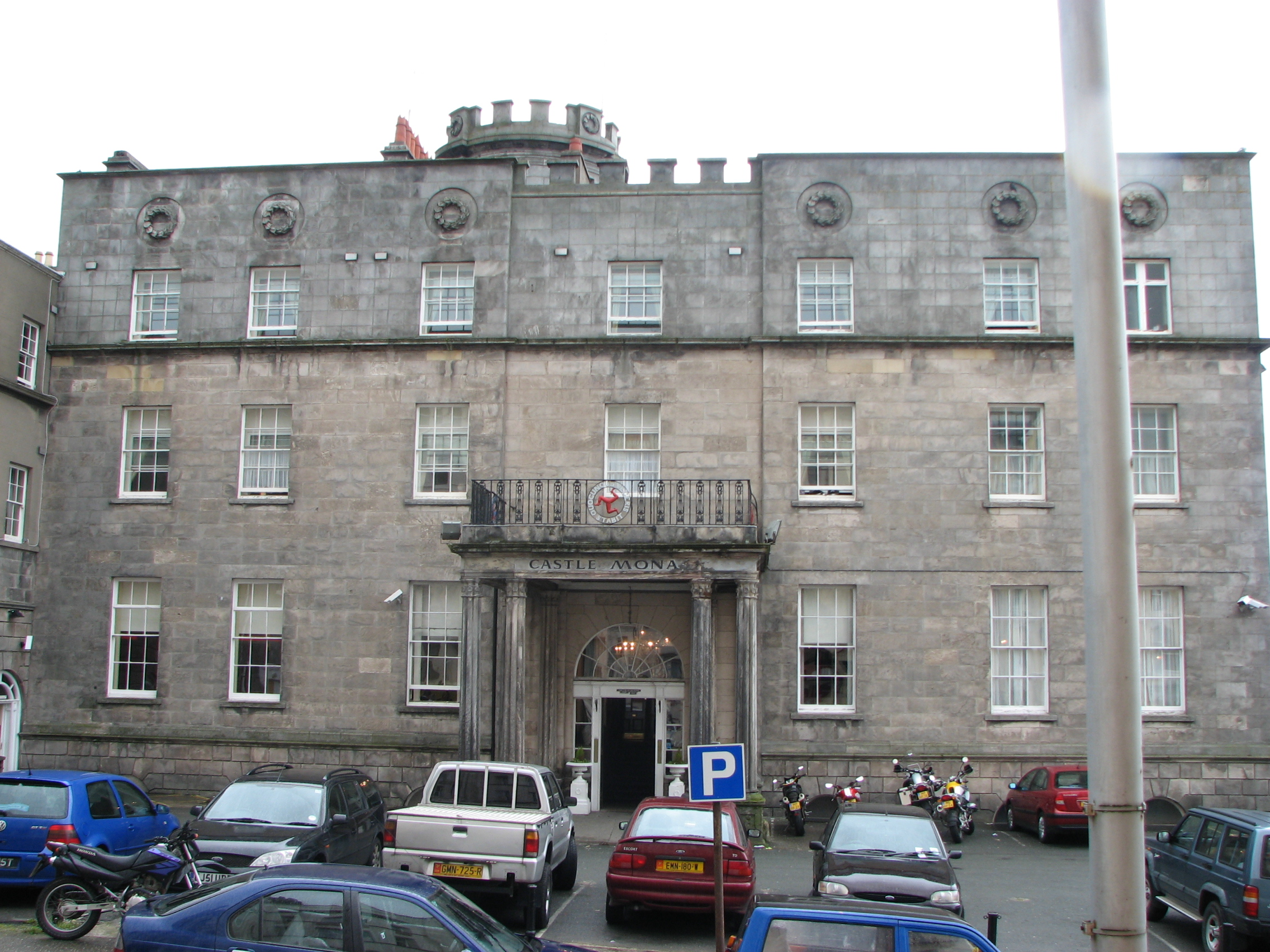
The hotel main entrance in 2006

In 2007 Castle Mona was acquired by the Sefton Group for £4 million with the stated intention of investing in the premises. However no such investment was forthcoming and consequently the structure fell into a significant state of disrepair - the building continuing to languish before once again being placed up for sale in 2011. Various would-be purchasers expressed intentions to purchase Castle Mona until it was eventually purchased at auction for £1.21 million in April 2018. The identity of the purchaser was kept secret until it was confirmed to be the Tevir Group, an Isle of Man-based property development company.

From purchase, the owners undertook incremental remedial works to secure the fabric and site, in addition to demolition of modern extensions to the listed structure.
