= Alured Dumbell =

Manx judge

Sir Alured Dumbell MLC (12 January 1835 – 12 March 1900) was a senior judge who was Clerk of the Rolls of the Isle of Man.

Dumbell was born in Douglas, the son of the well-known banker, lawyer and politician George Dumbell MHK and Mary Gibson, and was educated at a private school in Douglas. He then entered the firm of Harris and Adams as a law student. He was admitted to the bar in 1858 and soon acquired a large practice in the north of the island. He became High Bailiff of Ramsey in 1873 then Second Deemster in 1880, and finally Clerk of the Rolls in 1883.

He was knighted in the 1899 Birthday Honours list, and later the same year acted as Deputy Governor of the Isle of Man during the prolonged absence through illness of the Lieutenant-Governor Lord Henniker.

Dumbell died of paralysis in the brain on 12 March 1900.

That Sir Alured Dumbell was a man of great ability, but the success which he achieved in the legal profession was not so much due to the possession of any very exceptional degree of forensic acumen, but to his ready wit his practical business-like instincts, and his uncommon powers of penetration, combined with an integrity of purpose that was never absent from anything in his public career. In the Legislature, though his work was largely confined to criticism of others, he was, nevertheless, not only an influential but a very useful member, and, on its committees, in particular he did good service. Apart from his legal and legislative work his chief interest was in agriculture, of which he had considerable knowledge. He was a prominent member of the insular Agricultural Society, and some years ago, took the leading part in settling a dispute which arose between its northern and southern members. He is certainly one of the ablest men this island has produced during the present century.

— Isle of Man Times

== Family ==
Dumbell married, in 1875, Mary Rolston, daughter of Major Rolston, of the Indian Army.

== Offices of State ==
- High Bailiff of Ramsey, 1873–1880
- Second Deemster, 1880–1883
- Clerk of the Rolls, 1883–1900
