= Rushen Castle =

Rushen Castle may refer to:

== Historic Building ==
- Castle Rushen (Manx: Cashtal Rosien) is a medieval castle located in the Isle of Man's historic capital, Castletown.

== Ships ==
- HMS Rushen Castle, a Royal Navy Castle-class corvette launched in 1943.
- SS Rushen Castle, a packet steamer which was operated by the Isle of Man Steam Packet Company from her purchase in 1928 until she was sold for breaking in 1947.
