= Black people in Liverpool =

Racial and multi-ethnic group

Liverpudlian Blacks
Regions with significant populations
- Toxteth, Wavertree, Liverpool city centre, Kensington, Aigburth

Languages
- English

Religion
- Christianity

Related ethnic groups
- Mixed British • Black British • Caribbeans

Liverpool-born Blacks are people of Black African ancestry born in the city of Liverpool. Liverpool has the United Kingdom's oldest and longest established black community, going back several generations. Liverpool's black community is also unusual among those in the United Kingdom, as the Liverpool-born Black British community often constitute a category distinct from later African and Afro-Caribbean migrants.

== History ==
Dating to the 1730s, the Black community of Liverpool is Britain's oldest, with some Liverpudlians being able to trace their black heritage for as many as ten generations. The community dates back to the American Revolutionary War with Black Loyalists settling in the city. They were later followed by more African-American soldiers. The original African-American community was followed in the 19th and 20th centuries by sailors and soldiers from all over the West Indies and West Africa. The black community experienced continued growth due to the location of Liverpool as a port city. Liverpool's port attracted many servicemen and seafarers, including African Americans, Jamaicans, Trinidadians, Belizeans, Guyanese, Nigerians, Ghanaians, Gambians, and others from all over the Caribbean and Africa. Mostly settling in the Toxteth district, they joined already settled English, Irish, Welsh, Chinese and to a lesser extent Indians of seafarer or serviceman heritage. The Liverpudlian Black community became a Mixed-race community early on, with intermarriages taking place on a large scale among people with African, European and Asian roots. In turn most of today's Liverpudlian Blacks, even adding more recent Afro-Caribbean and African migrants, are product of a community that became a distinct multiracial community centuries ago. This process made the Liverpudlian Black community possibly the most distinct Black British community in the United Kingdom, creating a community that is native as well as unique to the country. In 2009 the black community was estimated to make up 1.9% of Liverpool's population. By 2011 the population of Liverpool was 2.8% black according to the 2011 census.

== Social unrest ==
The Liverpool Black community experienced unrest early on, with race riots going back to the time of soldiers returning from the First World War. In 1919, as part of that year's race riots, white mobs descended on the predominantly black/mixed-race areas of Toxteth, leading to the drowning of a black former sailor Charles Wootton, from the North Atlantic Imperial fortress colony of Bermuda.

Between 31 July and 2 August 1948, Liverpool experienced three nights of racial violence on a scale not witnessed since the end of the First World War.

Infamous were the 1981 Toxteth riots, which was the direct result of long-standing tensions between the local police and the black community and that saw hundreds of police and public injured, one man dead, 500 arrested, 70 buildings destroyed and damage estimated at £11m.

== Notable Black Liverpudlians ==
- Hope Akpan, footballer
- Trent Alexander-Arnold, footballer
- David Aliu, basketball player
- Diane Allahgreen, hurdler
- Chris Amoo, singer for soul group The Real Thing
- Joanne Anderson, Mayor of Liverpool (2021 - 2023)
- Victor Anichebe, footballer
- John Archer, politician
- Paul Barber, actor
- James Brown, newspaper editor and activist
- Joe Bygraves, boxer
- Craig Charles, actor and comedian
- Steven Cole, actor
- John Conteh, boxer
- Louis Emerick, actor
- Rebecca Ferguson, singer
- Howard Gayle, first black footballer to play for Liverpool F.C.
- Sugar Gibiliru, boxer
- Chelcee Grimes, footballer
- Billy Higgins, karateka
- Michael Ihiekwe, footballer
- Andy Iro, footballer
- Jetta, musician and singer
- Kim Johnson, MP for Liverpool Riverside
- Katarina Johnson-Thompson, heptathlete
- Natasha Jonas, boxer
- Leon Lopez, actor
- Cliff Marshall, first black Liverpudlian to play for Everton F.C.
- Adam Nowell, basketball player
- Anyika Onuora, sprinter
- Nikita Parris, footballer
- Larry Paul, boxer
- Jordan Ramos, gymnast
- Robin Reid, boxer
- Cathy Tyson, actress
- Kane Drummond, footballer
