= List of Wife Swap (British TV series) episodes =

This is a list of episodes for Wife Swap, a British reality show that aired on Channel 4 from 7 January 2003 to 19 December 2009, and returned for a one-off Brexit special on 15 June 2017. There were 11 seasons, as well as a celebrity version.

Information is available about 79 episodes, plus one episode which was filmed but not aired. The Daily Mirror reported in 2009 that the show had 83 episodes (which would total 84 after including the 2017 Brexit special), while Banijay currently states there were 80 episodes. Sources differ on the exact order of episodes and which episodes belong to each season. (Note: The list on the Channel 4 website had some inconsistencies. For example, it listed Season 7 episodes as first airing in 2008 when The Guardian reported that Season 7 had ended in 2006; listed one Season 7 episode as first airing in November 2008 when media reports stated it aired in May 2007; or grouped the final episode of the series as part of Season 10 and not Season 11.) For the purposes of this list, where seasons or dates are not known, episodes are ordered by their entries on major streaming platforms.

== Season 1 ==
Episode(s)	Synopsis	Wives		Air Date
1	An overweight White wife opposed to interracial marriage swaps with a fitness-conscious Black wife whose husband has strong views about a woman's role in the home.	Dee	Sonia	7 January 2003
2	A wife who tends to every need of her domineering, compulsive gambler husband swaps with a casting agent who runs a theatre workshop.	Michelle	Carol	14 January 2003
3	A mother of one who works long hours as a legal secretary swaps with a full-time mother of six.	Tracey	Kate	21 January 2003
4	An organized wife who shares household duties with her husband swaps with a wife who does all the housework despite also having a full-time job.	Anne	Diane	28 January 2003

== Season 2 ==
Episode(s)	Synopsis	Wives		Air Date
1	A wealthy wife whose husband spends more time playing video games than with his children swaps with the wife of a family-oriented canteen worker. Both husbands are also brothers.	Jayne	Nicola	30 September 2003
N/A	Wife Swap Changed Our Marriage. Retrospective on how the show impacted participants.	Season 1 couples		30 September 2003
2	A foul-mouthed mother of eight who receives unemployment benefits along with her husband swaps with a well-to-do working wife. The swap was ended by the first wife after three days because of fears her replacement was plotting to break up her marriage.	Lizzy Bardsley	Emma	7 October 2003
3	A vegan wife whose family shares domestic chores swaps with a wife whose husband is a junk food addict and does nothing around the house.	Kelly	Maxine	14 October 2003
4	A strict civil servant who fines her children for bad behavior swaps with a heavy smoker with no firm rules for her children.	Jude	Belinda	21 October 2003
5	A wife who is a pub landlord swaps with a wife who runs an upscale guest house.	Linda	Deborah	28 October 2003
6	Husband swap. A carefree self-professed "spiritual healer" with five dogs swaps with a stay-at-home father of seven who keeps his house spotlessly clean.	Darren	Nigel	4 November 2003
N/A	A Black wife swaps with a wife who holds admittedly racist views. The episode was filmed but never aired. Channel 4 claimed the tapes had been lost, while both couples stated they believed the episode was dropped because they had become friends.	Erinma	Liz	Unaired

== Season 3 ==
Episode(s)	Synopsis	Wives		Air Date
1	A wife of a van driver who encourages her children to swear swaps with a strict wife who is a prison warden.	Lucy	Pat	29 June 2004
N/A	Wife Swap Changed Our Marriage. Retrospective on how the show impacted participants.	Season 2 couples		29 June 2004
2	A single mother from East London who works at a youth center swaps with a wealthy housewife who lives in a mansion in Cornwall.	Shaz	Tracey	6 July 2004
3	An environmental campaigner whose family lives in a log cabin without modern conveniences swaps with a suburban wife whose family keeps a television in every room.	Emily	Joanna	13 July 2004
4	A teacher with a cultured lifestyle and passion for learning swaps with a wife who does everything around the house and whose family does not emphasize education.	Anne	Donna	20 July 2004
5	A wife dedicated to health and fitness swaps with a wife whose husband and her spend much of their free time on eBay selling junk items.	Sam	Carol-Anne	27 July 2004
6 (Note: Listed on streaming services as Season 3 Episode 6, but aired during Season 4.)	A wealthy wife with a fitness-obsessed husband swaps with a plus-size wife of a fence builder. This episode was halted halfway through after one wife brought a hamster into the other home during rule change without telling the husband.	Dawn	Leesa	16 November 2004

== Season 4 ==
Episode(s)	Synopsis	Wives		Air Date
1	A millionaire self-made businesswoman swaps with a full-time mother of eight whose frugal husband makes the financial decisions.	Deirdre	Margaret	26 October 2004
2	A carefree wife who does not clean her house swaps with a strict, organized wife. One of the couples split up at the end of the episode.	Jacqui	Becky	2 November 2004
3	A wife who expects her husband to provide for her and doesn't work, cook or clean swaps with a wife who believes she should serve her husband.	Bonny	Dorinda	January 2005
4	A teacher who runs a regimented home swaps with a disorganized wife whose nine-member family shares three bedrooms.	Donna	Kelly	January 2005
5	A female comedian who describes her parenting style as "healthy neglect" swaps with a wife who does everything for her children and unemployed husband.	JoJo	Dawn	2 February 2005
6	An image-obsessed wife who barely sees her two-year-old son swaps with a stay-at-home mother who doesn't focus on her appearance. During the table meeting, one wife threw a glass of water over the other, causing the show's camera crew to step in and prevent a physical altercation.	Penny	Penny	9 February 2005

== Season 5 ==
Episode(s)	Synopsis	Wives		Air Date
1	A wife who runs a sheep farm swaps with a city-dwelling wife whose husband regularly smokes cannabis.	Bridget	Carrie	19 September 2005
2	A wife obsessed with cleaning swaps with a laid-back wife who is a member of a motorcycle club with her husband.	Bess	Cheryl	26 September 2005
3	A hardworking strict British Pakistani wife swaps with a wife whose children are undisciplined and often use foul language.	Havovie	Sheila	3 October 2005
4	A wealthy Irish former model swaps with a wife who lives in a council flat with five children and an unemployed, gambling husband.	Debbie	Melissa	10 October 2005
5	A wife who spends most nights going out with her husband instead of spending time with her young daughter swaps with a Scottish wife from a frugal, tight-knit family.	Sharon	Wilma	17 October 2005
6	A single mother who doesn't like men telling her what to do and has a chaotic household swaps with a strict housewife whose husband owns a gym.	Sue	Bea	24 October 2005

== Season 6 ==
Episode(s)	Synopsis	Wives		Air Date
1	A wife who goes out to the pub most nights and whose partner does all the housework swaps with a mother of four with an immaculate home.	Yvonne	Michele	24 April 2006
2	A wife whose domineering, short-tempered husband runs the home like a military boot camp swaps with a mother whose boyfriend gets no respect from her children.	Sharon	Karen	31 April 2006
3	A wife who loves fashion and socializing swaps with a wife who moved with her family to the Isle of Lewis, a remote island in the Scottish Outer Hebrides.	Jayne	Jane	8 May 2006
4	A wife with spoiled children who is involved in local politics with her husband swaps with a strict wife who uses a whistle to discipline her children.	Jo	Suzanne	2006

== Season 7 ==
The episode order is not exactly known and is listed according to streaming services.

Episode(s)	Synopsis	Wives		Air Date
1	A busy mother of three who runs a successful hair salon swaps with a stay-at-home mother with a computer addict husband.	Angie	Debbie	9 October 2006
2	A self-made multimillionaire businesswoman swaps with a stay-at-home mother of four children.	Nancy	Lisa	2006
3	A single mother who believes in liberation through pole dancing swaps with a wife who serves her husband and believes old fashioned values have made her marriage successful.	Donna	Michelle	2006
4	A wife who is against traditional routines and used to live in a van swaps with a highly organized wife who emphasizes financial success.	Jan	Deborah	14 October 2006
5 (Note: Listed on streaming services as Season 7 Episode 5, but aired during Season 8.)	A nightclub dancer who doesn't spend much time with her daughter swaps with a horse trainer whose family keeps to themselves.	Tori	Paula	22 April 2007

== Season 8 ==
The episode order is not exactly known and is listed according to streaming services. Most of these episodes were listed by Channel 4 as either Season 7 or Season 8.

Episode(s)	Synopsis	Wives		Air Date
1	A health-conscious paraplegic swaps with an overweight, easy-going wife.	Ruth	Sue	April 2007
2	A devoutly religious Muslim wife swaps with a liberal who is the sole breadwinner for her family.	Nuzhat	Deborah	2007
3	A wife who along with her husband is a Labour Party councillor and whose constituents' needs sometimes come before her children's swaps with a wife whose main priorities are looking good and taking care of her family.	Julie	Tina	13 May 2007
4	A stay-at-home mother of five who does not discipline her kids swaps with a wife who believes in structure and strict chore routines.	Alison	Michelle	2007
5	A single father who lets his two teenage sons make their own rules swaps with a strict, traditional wife whose immigrant family owns a convenience store.	John	Smruty	2007
6 (Note: Season 8 Episode 6 is not available on streaming services.)	A wife in an alternative lifestyle whose husband and her both have girlfriends swaps with a traditional wife whose husband makes her do chores despite having a muscle disease. The husband in the former couple died of a suspected drug overdose in May 2008 after the marriage failed. His wife had criticized the show for goading contestants "into behaving how they want you to behave".	Jane	Debbie	October 2007
7	A wife whose husband does everything for her, and whose mother and stepdad help raise her children, swaps with a wife who does all the household duties for her domineering husband.	Karen	Andrea	October 2007
8	A lesbian whose family is reliant on benefits for income swaps with a wife from a conservative farming family whose husband works 70 hours a week.	Jess	Mandy	2007
9	A stay-at-home wife from the countryside whose husband hunts for food swaps with a businesswoman whose husband does most of the childcare.	Sally	Dalite	28 October 2007
10	A wife who is a swinger along with her husband and whose daughter works as a pole dancer swaps with a strict wife who is training her 11-year-old daughter to swim in the Olympics.	Chris	Tracey	2007

== Season 9 ==
The episode order is not exactly known and is listed according to streaming services. Channel 4 listed most of these episodes as part of Season 9, and one as Season 8.

Episode(s)	Synopsis	Wives		Air Date
1	A strict wife who doesn't let her children watch TV swaps with a wife whose children decide whether to go to school and whose husband and sons perform in a comedy band.	Ife	Debbie	17 February 2008
2	A devout Christian who follows the Bible to the letter swaps with a Christian who drinks and gambles and whose husband does most of the housework.	Judith	Dawn	2008
3	A traditional rural wife who has six children and 50 pets swaps with a busy wife who works as a property developer and glamour model.	Michele	Louise	2008
4	A wealthy socialite with a five-bedroom villa swaps with a wife who lives a self-sufficient, carbon-neutral lifestyle on a boat. Both families are British expatriates living in Spain.	Anna	Kara	2008
5	A wife who eats from dustbins and lives in a van with other members of a fringe religious group swaps with a millionaire housewife with pampered, overachieving children.	Susan	Debbie	9 February 2008
6	A strict disciplinarian whose husband is out working most evenings swaps with a laid-back mother of seven children.	Raquel	Ronnie	2008
7	A wife who is blind since birth and runs a tight ship at home swaps with a wife who juggles five children and three internet businesses.	Penny	Vanessa	12 September 2008
8	A mother of ten who is hoping to pursue a career swaps with a wife who runs a sweetshop and whose husband put his business on hold to take care of their children. The swap was ended halfway after the second wife got thrown out of the house after an argument.	Emma	Sam	31 August 2008
9	A strict wife who lives in the country swaps with a laid-back wife who runs an alternative fashion business.	Nadine	Red	2008

== Season 10 ==
The episode order is not exactly known and is listed according to streaming services. Channel 4 listed these episodes as part of Season 9 and 10.

Episode(s)	Synopsis	Wives		Air Date
1	A gay man who lives with his partner and daughter from a previous marriage swaps with a Bulgarian-born world-class female bridge player with traditional views.	Andy	Nevena	2008
2	A wife from a family where both parents work and the children have packed schedules swaps with a wife constantly on call for her controlling husband, who cannot work due to an injury.	Suzanne	Wioletta	2008
3	A born-again Christian who lives a bohemian lifestyle on a 200-acre farm swaps with a busy town-dwelling housewife.	Sue	Beverley	2009
4	A wife who runs a pub together with her partner swaps with a wife who works multiple jobs as the sole breadwinner in her household.	Sam	Natalie	2009
5	A wife who is a professional acrobat along with her husband swaps with a classroom assistant whose husband and her live mostly separate lives.	Anita Ramos	Julie	28 June 2009

== Season 11 ==
The episode order is not exactly known and is listed according to streaming services. Channel 4 listed most of these episodes as part of Season 11, and one as Season 10.

Episode(s)	Synopsis	Wives		Air Date
1	An image-obsessed housewife who devotes herself to her husband swaps with a veterinary nurse whose busy schedule leaves little time for herself or romance.	Andrea	Kathy	2009
2	A laid-back mother who lets her teenage stepdaughter smoke and drink swaps with a former professional squash player who runs her house like a military campaign.	Tara	Sam	2009
3	A hairdresser who has a jam-packed schedule swaps with a wife who is rarely up before lunch and spends much of her time chatting with friends online.	Kerry	Kelly	2009
4	A wife who works night shifts and cleans her house daily without the help of her family swaps with a wife who runs a business empire and whose family pulls their weight.	Michele	Tracy	2009
5	A devout Christian immigrant wife from Sierra Leone swaps with a wife who regularly swears and believes in relaxed parenting.	Agnes	Lisa	2009
6	A wealthy Bentley-driving lady of leisure swaps with a mother of seven from a large council estate.	Torre	Sam	19 December 2009

== Brexit special ==
Episode(s)	Synopsis	Wives		Air Date
1	A barmaid who is a Brexit supporter swaps with a Green Party councilor who supports the United Kingdom remaining in the European Union.	Pauline	Kat	15 June 2017

== Celebrity Wife Swap ==
According to Banijay, there were 12 episodes of the celebrity version. Channel 4 only listed 8 episodes.

Episode(s)	Synopsis	Celebrities		Air Date
1	Big Brother contestant Jade Goody swaps with the wife of Who Wants to Be a Millionaire? contestant Charles Ingram.	Jade Goody	Charles Ingram	11 November 2003
2	Politician Edwina Currie swaps with the wife of television personality John McCririck.	Edwina Currie	John McCririck	3 October 2006
3	The wife of TV magician Paul Daniels swaps with radio presenter Vanessa Feltz.	Paul Daniels	Vanessa Feltz	1 April 2007
4	Singer Pete Burns swaps with the wife of former football player Neil Ruddock.	Pete Burns	Neil Ruddock	30 September 2007
5	The wife of comedian Freddie Starr swaps with singer Samantha Fox.	Freddie Starr	Samantha Fox	27 January 2008
6	Pop singer Sinitta swaps with the wife of Coronation Street star Bruce Jones.	Sinitta	Bruce Jones	23 March 2008
7	TV food and wine critic Jilly Goolden swaps with the wife of singer Alexander O'Neal.	Jilly Goolden	Alexander O'Neal	10 August 2008
8	Comedian Rhona Cameron swaps with the wife of comedian Stan Boardman.	Rhona Cameron	Stan Boardman	07 June 2009
9	Former javelin athlete Tessa Sanderson swaps with the wife of former football player Ron Atkinson.	Tessa Sanderson	Ron Atkinson	16 August 2009

== Wife Swap: The Aftermath ==
There was a spinoff series on E4 called Wife Swap: The Aftermath, where couples who had previously appeared would each watch their episode live and then reunite for the first time since the show aired. It was first broadcast in 2005 alongside Wife Swap's fifth season.
