= Pavel Zuna =

Czech journalist (born 1967)

Pavel Zuna (born March 31, 1967) is a Czech journalist and one of the most popular anchormen and reporters of the post-revolutionary era. During his career, he worked in consecutive high position on all three most viewed TV channels in the country. Throughout his career, he won a number of awards and established several new programs. Since 2012 Zuna has been working for the company Emma Capital and since 2018 he has been an active participant in the production of shows for an internet television MALL.TV.

== Early life ==
Zuna was born in Prague, Czechoslovakia. His father, Petr Zuna, is a professor at Czech Technical University in Prague and from 1997 to 1999 was its rector. Mother, Marie, works as a doctor. After his graduation from high school in 1985, Zuna started his studies at the University of Economics in Prague. In 1989, he obtained an engineering degree specializing in International Business.

== Career ==
=== Czechoslovak and Czech Television ===
In 1991, as an intern, Zuna entered Czechoslovak Television and in the summer of 1992 got a chance to host its main news program called Deník ČST (Journal of Czechoslovak Television). In 1993 the TV station was divided and Zuna became an anchorman of a show Události, komentáře (Events, Comments) aired on newly formed Czech Television. In the same year he started hosting the main news program in the evening. On the top of that, during the time he worked as editor in chief of the economic news department. Between 1996 and 1998 he was covering news from foreign journeys of Czech president Václav Havel, whom he was accompanying as a journalist on many of his travels.

=== Philip Morris ===
In 1998, Zuna left television and started working as a spokesman of the company Tabák a.s. (today's name Philip Morris) for the Czech Republic. Before the end of the year, the director of TV Nova, Vladimír Železný, offered him a job as a host of the main news broadcasting show and Zuna decided to sign the contract.

=== TV Nova ===
He started his career on TV Nova on the day of its fifth anniversary – February 4, 1999. For the few next years, his co-anchor became Mirka Čejková. In August 1999, he was promoted to editor in chief of the whole news department, plus he kept on working as an anchorman of news program called Televizní noviny (Television Newspaper).

Under his leadership the news department started a couple of new shows – Střepiny (The Splinters) and Víkend (The Weekend). In 2004, Zuna switched his editorial position for a job as the deputy of director of programs, who at the time was Libuše Šmuclerová. Apart from hosting Televizní noviny, he took the responsibility for special projects of TV Nova. He was in charge with the first and second season of shows called Česko hledá SuperStar (Czech version of Pop/American Idol) and Výměna manželek (Wife Swap). He also wrote the narration commentary for Výměna manželek.

=== Media Break ===
In 2006, Zuna left for a job in the business sector and worked for one year with the company Home Credit in Russia. He returned to TV screens in 2007, this time as an employee for television Prima.

=== Prima ===
From 2007, he was hosting Prima's version of the show Deal or No Deal, called Ber nebo neber. One year later he started working as editor in chief of the news department also while working as an anchorman, once again for the main news program Zprávy (News). Zuna changed the structure of Zprávy as well as its broadcasting time. He moved the show from 7 PM to 7:30 PM, with the intention to compete with TV Nova's news program, which started at 7:30 PM as well and which Zuna turned into the most viewed news show in the country nine years ago. But after a promising beginning the rating of Zprávy fell back down and three months later Prima was forced to pick an earlier time – 6:55 PM.

=== Stream.cz ===
In 2010, he accepted the position as program director for an online television Stream.cz. He also contributed to the following shows, either as an author or a dramaturge:

- 2010: Sexuální idoly století (Sex Idols of the Century)
- 2010 – 2018: Slavné dny (Famous Days)
- 2011 – 2012: Slavné dvojice (Famous Couples)
- 2011 – 2018: Slavné sportovní okamžiky (Famous Sport Moments)
- 2012 – 2013: Závod o hrad (Race for the Castle)
- 2014 – 2018: Slavní neznámí (Famous Unknown)
- 2015 – 2018: Slavné značky (Famous Brands)

In 2014, Zuna wrote a successful book Slavné dny, which he based on 52 episodes from the same named show. In 2016, a sequel was published, bringing another 52 stories.

=== MALL.TV ===
In 2018, a major part of the Stream.cz team (including Zuna) left the platform and joined a new online television named MALL.TV. Zuna came with three brand new shows, while the newest one, Lives of Famous Ones, is being created in cooperation with other writers (Zuna himself serves as a co-author and executive producer). The shows produced under MALL.TV are:

- 2018–2019: Legendární komentátoři (Legendary Commentators)
- 2019–present: Top Moment
- 2020–present: Životy slavných (Lives of Famous Ones)

Nowadays, he is still involved in two of the shows from the list above.

== Awards ==
Among his most notable successes is winning the TýTý award for A Personality of Television News Broadcasting for six consecutive years, underlining his achievements between the years 1999 and 2004. Since then, no one has won that category as many times as Zuna and his six awards still maintain a record number.

From 1999 until 2005, he was also regularly chosen for TV Nova's award ANNO for the category Man of the Year. The station's audience voted him as the most popular personality seven times in the row.
