= SS Rushen Castle =

Packet steamer

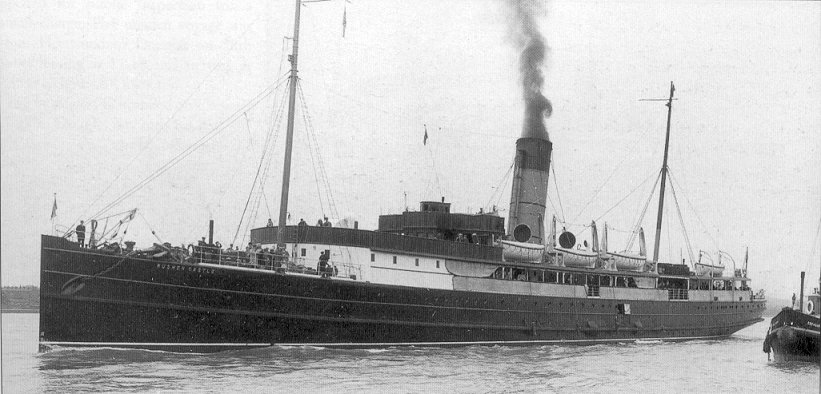
- Rushen Castle

History
- Name: Rushen Castle formerly Duke of Cornwall
- Namesake: Rushen Castle
- Owner: 1898–1923: London and North Western Railway; 1923–1928: London, Midland and Scottish Railway; 1928–1947: Isle of Man Steam Packet Company
- Operator: 1898–1923: London and North Western Railway; 1923–1928: London, Midland and Scottish Railway; 1928–1947: Isle of Man Steam Packet Company
- Port of registry: Douglas, Isle of Man (previously Lancaster, United Kingdom).
- Route: 1898–1911: Fleetwood - Derry; 1923–1928: Heysham - Douglas; 1928–1946: Douglas - Various
- Builder: Vickers Sons, and Maxim Ltd, Barrow-in-Furness
- Cost: Not Recorded. Purchased in 1928 by the Isle of Man Steam Packet Company for £29,254.
- Launched: 23 April 1898
- Acquired: 1928
- In service: 1898
- Out of service: 1947
- Identification: Official number: 109661.
- Fate: Broken up at Ghent, Belgium.

General characteristics
- Type: Packet Steamer
- Tonnage: 1,724 gross register tons (GRT)
- Length: 315 ft (96 m)
- Beam: 37 ft 1 in (11.30 m)
- Depth: 16 ft 6 in (5.03 m)
- Installed power: 5,520 horsepower
- Propulsion: Two triple-expansion reciprocating engines
- Speed: 17.5 knots (20.1 mph)
- Capacity: 1,052 passengers
- Crew: 52

The packet steamer SS Rushen Castle was operated by the Isle of Man Steam Packet Company from its purchase in 1928 until it was sold for breaking in 1947.

== Origins ==
Originally named Duke of Cornwall the vessel was operated by the London and North Western Railway from 1898 to 1923, from where she passed into the ownership of the London, Midland and Scottish Railway in the 1923 grouping of railway companies, and was subsequently sold to the Isle of Man Steam Packet company in 1928 when she was renamed Rushen Castle.

== Dimensions ==
Constructed in the yards of Vickers Sons, and Maxim Ltd at Barrow-in-Furness in 1898, Duke of Cornwall had a tonnage of 1,724 GRT.

Length 315'; beam 37'1"; depth 16'6". The Duke of Cornwall had accommodation for 1,052 passengers and a crew of 52.

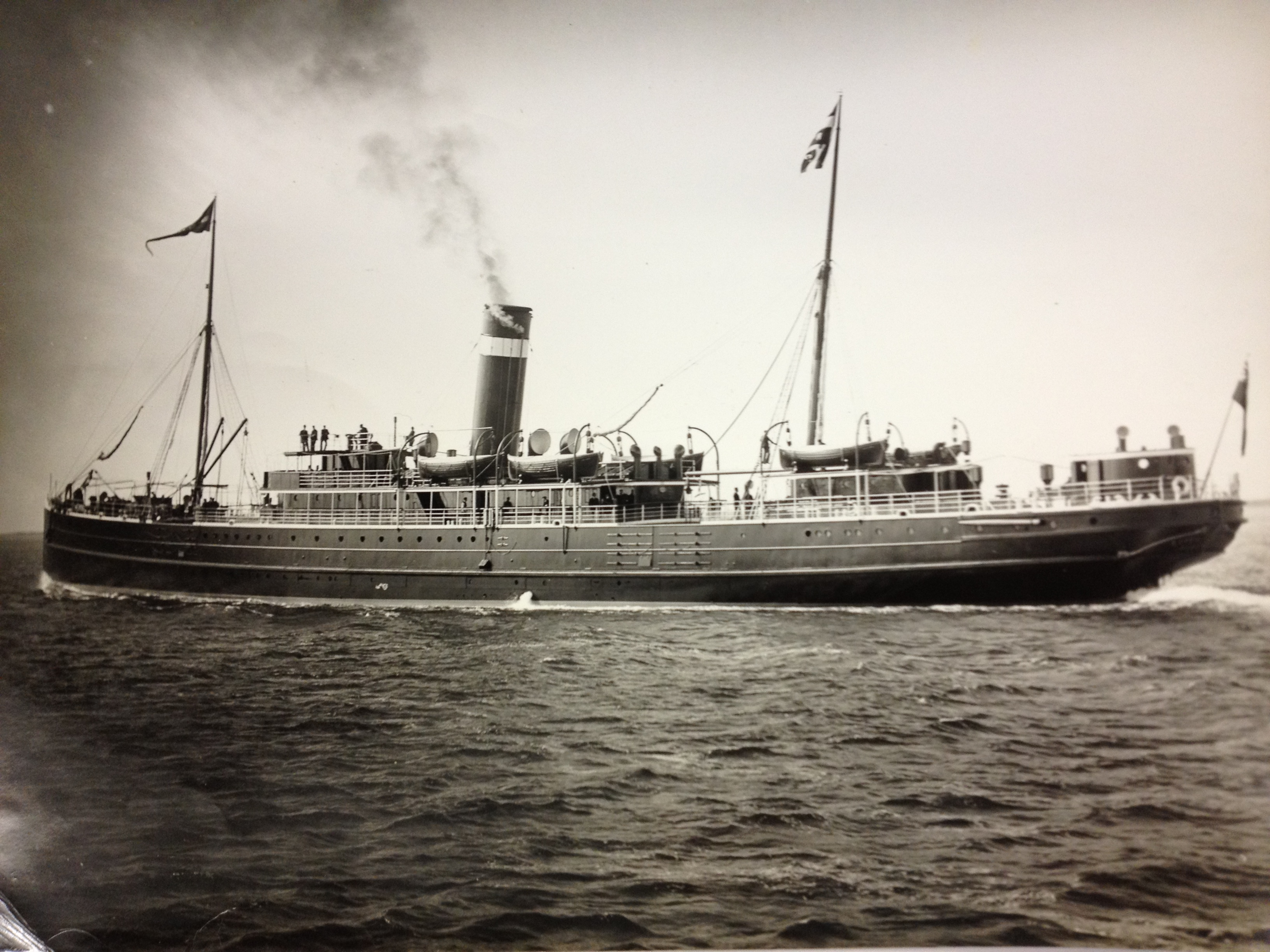
SS Duke of Cornwall.

Duke of Cornwall was a steel twin-screw vessel powered by two triple-expansion reciprocating engines, and produced 5,520 i.h.p. This gave the ship an operating speed of 17.5 knots.

== Service life ==
=== London and North Western Railway & L.M.S. Railway Service ===
In 1898 Duke of Cornwall entered service from her home port, Fleetwood, operating to Derry and Belfast for the London and North Western Railway.

Following the Railways Act 1921, Duke of Cornwall was subsequently employed on the service from Heysham - Douglas on behalf of the newly formed London, Midland and Scottish Railway.

=== Isle of Man Steam Packet Company Service ===
Purchased by the Isle of Man Steam Packet Company in 1928, the vessel was renamed Rushen Castle, and entered service to the numerous ports then served by the company.

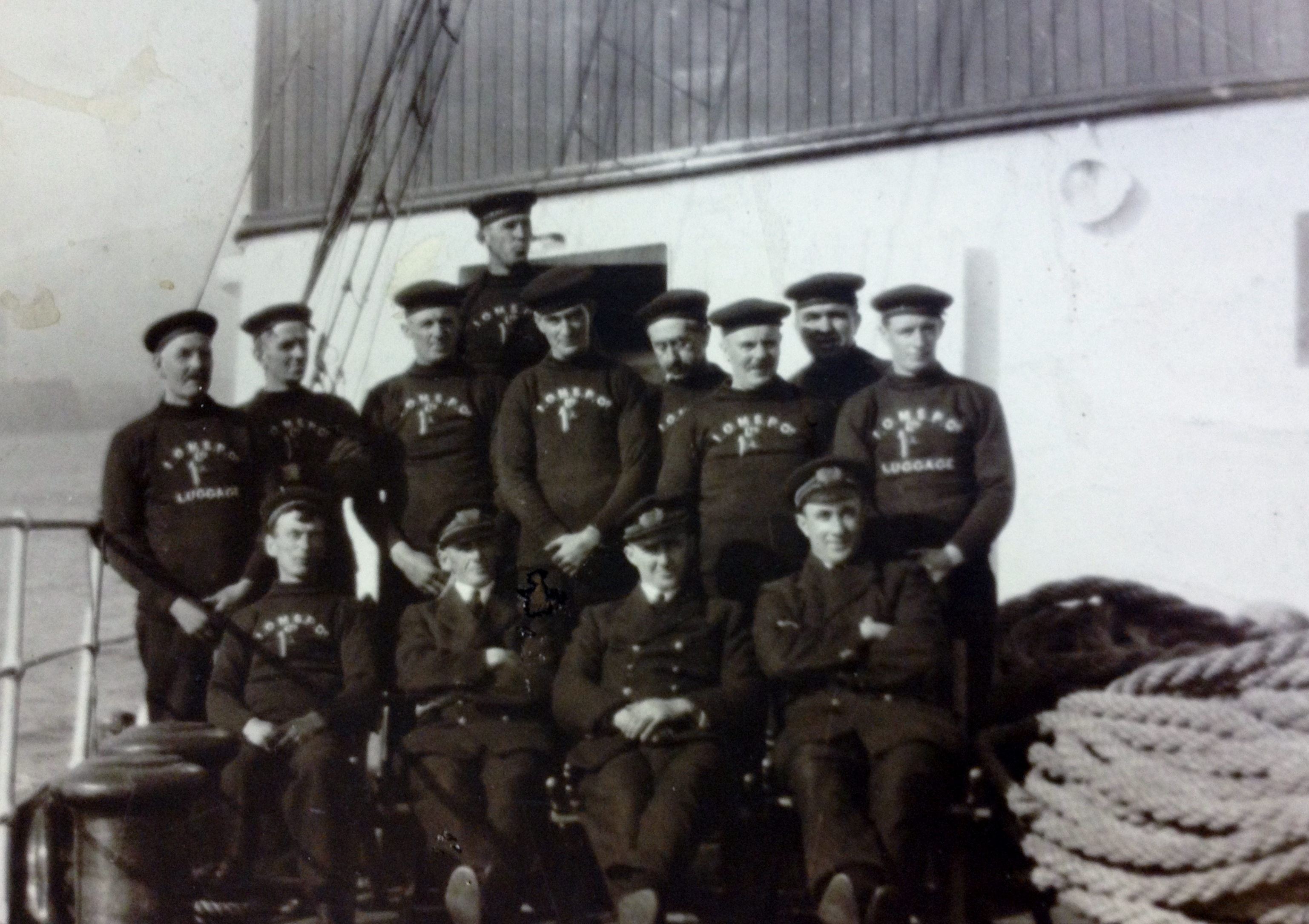
Officers and Deck Crew of SS Rushen Castle, 1928.

Smaller than her immediate contemporaries, Rushen Castle was used on winter service. Strong southeasterly gales affected the Isle of Man in early March, 1937, affecting sea and air services. On Thursday March 11, whilst moored alongside the Victoria Pier, the Rushen Castle had to beak away to avoid damage caused by the swell. She put to sea at 07:15 hours and made for Peel taking 3 hours to make passage. She then departed for Liverpool at 11:50.

Rushen Castle stayed with the Steam Packet Company during the Second World War, being one of the ships which maintained the vital lifeline, first to Liverpool until the end of 1940, and then to her former home, Fleetwood.

During the war Rushen Castle established what is arguably the longest modern passage between Liverpool and Douglas. On Saturday 27 January 1940 she sailed for Douglas at 10:45, and was instructed by radio to make for Peel as an easterly gale had blown up and made Douglas untenable. Being wartime the message named the captain but not the ship, and by mistake said "go to the West," which would have indicated Peel to Captain Bridson. The captain duly tried to get into Douglas but was then signaled to make for Peel. By the time the ship got to Peel the wind had veered and berthing at Peel was not possible. Eventually the Rushen Castle did get in at Peel - at 10:00hrs on Tuesday 30 January, after being at sea for 71 hours. The Earl of Granville, Lieutenant Governor of the Island at the time was one of the passengers.

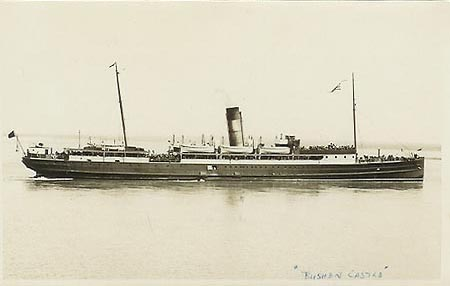
Rushen Castle on Steam Packet service.

== Post-war Service and Disposal ==
Rushen Castle re-opened the normal Douglas - Liverpool service on 6 April 1946. However, with the return from war service of several of its twins, Rushen Castle was withdrawn from service, and laid up in Douglas prior to its disposal.

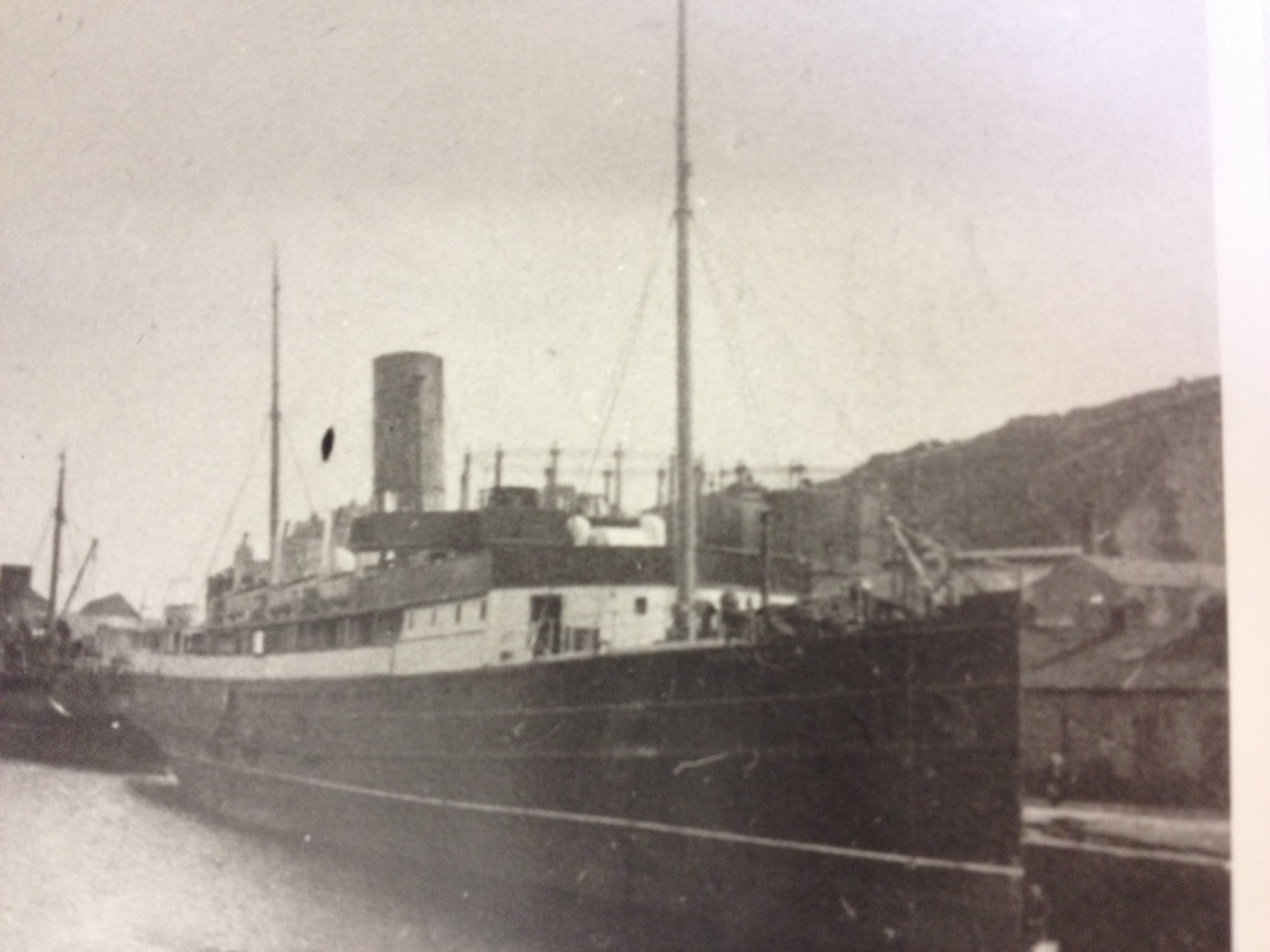
Rushen Castle laid up at the Tongue, Douglas, 1946.

In January 1947 Rushen Castle was taken under tow to the Belgian port of Ghent, for scrapping.
