= Isle of Man Prison =

Prison in Jurby, Isle of Man

Coordinates: 54°21′21″N 4°31′44″W

- Interactive map of Isle of Man Prison
- Location: Jurby, Isle of Man
- Status: Operational
- Security class: Medium Security
- Capacity: 144
- Opened: 14 August 2008
- Managed by: Isle of Man Prison Service
- Governor: Leroy Bonnick

Isle of Man Prison is a mixed-use prison located in the Jurby parish of the Isle of Man. The prison is operated by the Isle of Man Prison Service (part of the Department of Home Affairs) and is the only functioning prison on the island.

== History ==
From 1891 the prison population of the Isle of Man was held at the Victoria Road Prison in Douglas. Although expanded many times over the course of its history, overcrowding at the prison was a recurring problem from the 1990s onwards, and the prison was often criticised for its limited and outdated facilities. In 2005 Tynwald approved the construction of a new prison on the site of the former RAF Jurby to replace the old prison in Douglas.

Construction of the prison was largely carried out by local contractors from the island, though all of the cellular accommodation was constructed using pre-formed cast concrete panels, which were shipped to the island from a specialist manufacturer and transported by road to Jurby. In order that the prison might fit harmoniously into its environment, the prison grounds were landscaped, with ongoing maintenance by supervised, trusted prisoners.

Construction of the new prison was due to be completed in December 2007, but because of poor weather, Christmas holidays and testing of equipment and security systems, that deadline was not met. The Isle of Man Prison Service took control of the new prison site in late January 2008, with the prison becoming fully operational on 14 August. As of January 2008, construction of the £41.7m facility was the Isle of Man Government's largest capital project.

In October 2011, an inspection report from the Chief Inspector of Prisons called for significant improvements to be made at Isle of Man Prison. The report revealed high reoffending rates, illegal drug use and a lack of activity for inmates as causes for concern. However the report praised the prison buildings and the very good staff-prisoner relationships.

In 2019, the prison was the subject of the ITV fly-on-the-wall documentary series The Best Little Prison in Britain?. The first episode was broadcast on 31 July. Some months before the series was transmitted, media speculated that it would be a Love Island-style series focusing on "prisoners' romances and clashes". A spokesman for the Isle of Man Government said the programme would feature "serious" content. The series drew some online criticism, with some viewers calling the prison's regime an "embarrassment". On 31 August, Isle of Man Today reported that episodes of the documentary had twice been removed from the ITV Hub so that they could be edited due to ongoing legal proceedings involving some of the people who featured in the series.

In April 2025, a Constitutional and Legal Affairs and Justice Committee hearing was told that every aspect of the prison was being "tested" as the prison was almost at full capacity. On 7 April, 160 of the 167 spaces were being used. Dan Davies, the Chief Executive of the Department of Home Affairs, said the Department was looking at solutions such as electronic tagging and the construction of a new wing.

== The prison today ==
All inmates at Isle of Man Prison are located in single cells equipped with a toilet and washing facilities. There are separate units for remand and convicted prisoners as well as units for female prisoners, young offenders and vulnerable prisoners. There is also a segregation unit. The prison offers health, welfare and administration facilities, a visitors’ centre and parking areas.

A variety of educational and vocational training is available to inmates at the prison, including painting and decorating, joinery, and plumbing skills, with additional courses in basic literacy and numeracy, information technology, arts and crafts, music, PSHE and general academic subjects provided by tutors from the University College Isle of Man. Inmates who study catering and industrial cleaning may work towards National Vocational Qualifications.

== Notable inmates ==
- Trevor Baines

== See also ==
- Guernsey Prison
- HM Prison La Moye
