= The Ramos Acrobats =

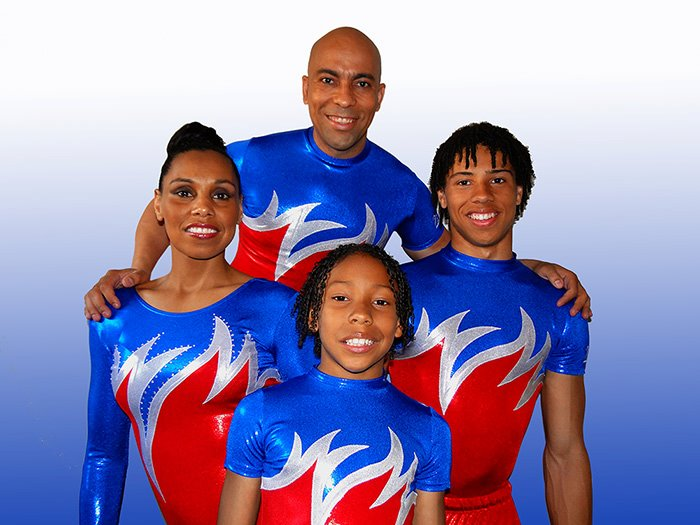

Background information
- Origin: Liverpool, England
- Genres: Reality TV Star, Media Personality
- Years active: 1995–2015
- Members: Marcelo de Ramos; Anita Grosvenor Ramos; Jordan Ramos; Samuel Ramos; Rio Ramos

The Ramos Acrobats is an English media and television personality family who appeared in the Channel 4 series Wife Swap in 2009. Before the appearance, members of the family had other television appearances, including Guinness World Records Smashed and Britain’s Got Talent.

== Family ==
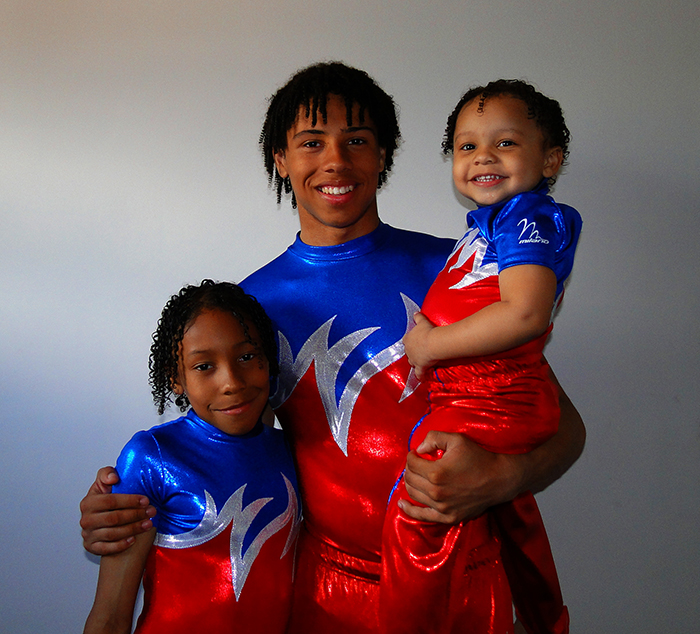
Jordan, Samuel and Rio Ramos.

The family consists of husband Marcelo de Ramos, born in Brazil, who is professionally known as "Marcelo The Daredevil". He is a stuntman and extreme gymnast, originally from Brazil. Wife Anita Grosvenor Ramos born in Liverpool, acrobat and keep fit instructor. Marcelo and Anita have 3 children. Jordan Ramos is a former gymnast for Great Britain, and represented Great Britain in two Junior World Tumbling Championships. The other brothers are Samuel Ramos and Rio Ramos.

== Wife Swap controversy ==
The family appeared in Wife Swap and made headlines when stuntman acrobat Marcelo allowed his TV 'partner' classroom assistant to sleep in their marital bed. Acrobat and keep fit instructor Anita Ramos was said to be furious.
