= HM Prison La Moye =

Prison in Jersey

HMP La Moye
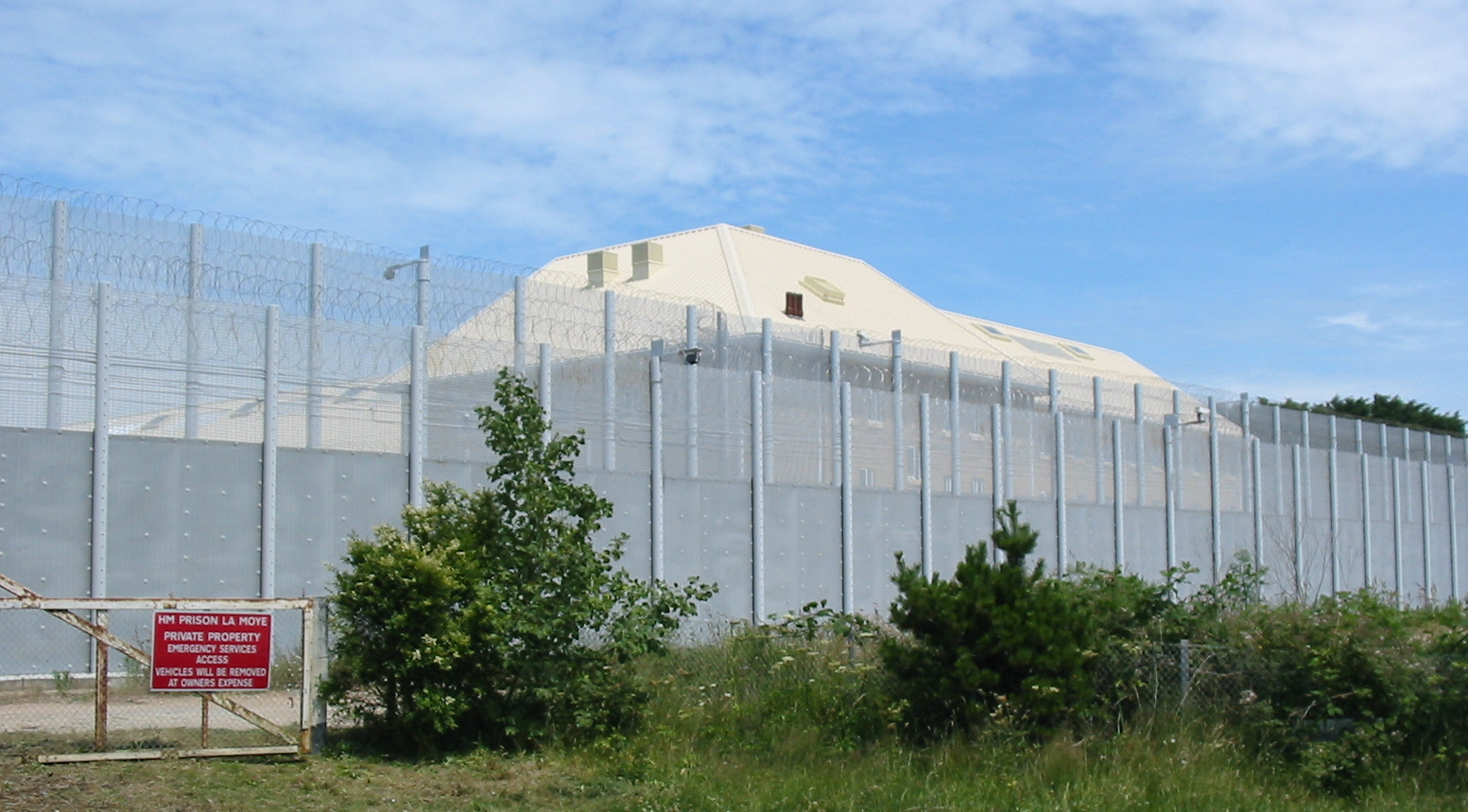
- Interactive map of HMP La Moye
- Location: Vingtaine de la Moye, Jersey, Channel Islands; 49.1791°N 2.2195°W
- Status: Operational
- Security class: Medium Security
- Capacity: 268 (Dec. 2009)
- Population: 178 (avg. 2010)
- Opened: 1974
- Managed by: States of Jersey Prison Service
- Governor: Paul Yates

HM Prison La Moye is a mixed-use prison on the island of Jersey. La Moye is currently Jersey's only prison, and is situated within the boundaries of the Vingtaine de la Moye. It is operated by the Jersey Prison Service, part of the Department of Home Affairs.

The prison was opened in the mid-1970s, and originally built to house 150 inmates. Because La Moye is the island's only jail, it has to provide accommodation for men, women and vulnerable prisoners. The young offenders wing was closed due to no funding. Consequently, there are four distinctive areas of the prison which have been set aside for each category of inmate.

== Facilities ==
The prison has an active education programme and all prisoners are encouraged to participate. Prisoners are usually assessed to determine their level of education within a short time of arriving at La Moye. Inmates can study both academic and vocational qualifications. La Moye also has a library which was opened in November 2007.

== Overcrowding concerns ==
In July 2005, a report from HM Inspector of Prisons stated the prison had 172 inmates, with capacity for 184. This led to concerns about possible overcrowding at the prison. In November 2007, Jersey's Home Affairs Minister Wendy Kinnard expressed fears that Jersey had a higher pro rata prison population when compared to other European countries of a similar size. She called for alternative punishments to be introduced to ease pressure on the prison.

== Modernisation and wing renaming ==
In 2023, as part of an ongoing modernisation programme at HM Prison La Moye, the prison’s original A–G wings were demolished. These were replaced by newer facilities H, J, K, and L wings, which were subsequently renamed in honour of notable Jersey citizens who served during World War I and World War II.

- J Wing was renamed Journeaux Wing, after a Royal Navy sailor.
- K Wing became Kendal Wing, in honour of a sailor who served aboard HMS Indefatigable.
- L Wing was renamed Lugard Wing, after an Army sergeant.
- H Wing, the women's unit, was designated Hogarth Wing, commemorating two nurses who served in the Second World War.

According to then-Governor Susie Richardson, the renaming formed part of a broader effort to "deinstitutionalise the environment" within the prison. A new administration block was also opened during the same period and dedicated to Len Norman, former Minister for Home Affairs in the States of Jersey.

== Notable inmates ==
Inmates of La Moye Prison have included:

- John Hervey, 7th Marquess of Bristol, British aristocrat and businessman
- Curtis Warren, English gangster, subsequently transferred to HMP Belmarsh

== See also ==
- Guernsey Prison
- Isle of Man Prison
