= Guernsey Prison =

Prison in Guernsey

Coordinates: 49.4776°N 2.5408°W

Guernsey Prison (also known as Les Nicolles Prison) is a mixed-use prison on the island of Guernsey. Opened in 1989, it is currently Guernsey's only prison, and therefore accommodates male, female and vulnerable prisoners, both of juvenile and adult ages. The prison has 11 wings, and a capacity of 139. It is operated by the States of Guernsey.

== History ==
The prison has seen its population fluctuate considerably over the years. Numbers peaked at 127 in August 2012, before falling to an all-time low of 89 in 2015. The prison's population has steadily increased again since the COVID-19 pandemic, reaching 99 in November 2024.

On 1 January 2013, Guernsey became the second jurisdiction in Europe to implement a smoking ban in its prisons (following a ban in the Isle of Man in 2008). Inmates at Les Nicolles were given notice of the ban and encouraged to attend courses to give up smoking, while e-cigarettes were allowed as an alternative to tobacco. The ban was introduced without any unrest among prisoners.

In March 2018, Les Nicolles became the first prison to employ Sky Fence drone technology, designed to prevent drugs and other contraband items being smuggled into prisons.

In February 2025, BBC News reported that prisoners at Guernsey Prison had helped to build 50 wooden benches for use on the Channel Island of Herm.

== See also ==
- HM Prison La Moye
- Isle of Man Prison
