= Victoria Road Prison =

Former prison in Douglas, Isle of Man

- Location: Douglas, Isle of Man
- Status: Decommissioned
- Capacity: 90
- Opened: April 1891
- Closed: August 2008
- Managed by: Isle of Man Prison Service

Victoria Road Prison is a former prison that was located on Victoria Road in Douglas, capital of the Isle of Man. Victoria Road Prison was the first purpose-built prison to be constructed on the Isle of Man, and held prisoners from April 1891 to August 2008.

== History ==
From 1780 prisoners from the Isle of Man (including debtors) mainly served their sentence at Castle Rushen, but within a century problems were apparent with this arrangement. Prisoners would grow unruly, as they could not be separated, and the conditions in which they were kept were unfit. When the Chairman of the Commissioners for Prisons in England and Wales inspected the premises for the first time in 1885, he indicated a need for a prison to house 30 prisoners. His recommendation was not universally popular in Tynwald, as some did not want to spend the money, but nevertheless Manx architect James Cowle was employed to design a new prison, which was subsequently constructed at Victoria Road in Douglas. The entire prison population of the Isle of Man was transferred to the new Victoria Road Gaol in April 1891.

At the beginning of the 20th century, Victoria Road Prison received a glowing report from Major Darnell, the HM Inspector of Prisons:

The present accommodation consists of 21 cells in the male and eight cells in the female prison. The cells are light and airy, and well ventilated and compare quite favourably with those in the best English prisons — boarded floors, clear glass in the windows and external gas boxes. They were uniformly clean and well kept.

As the population of both Island and prison grew, the prison was expanded, with the addition of two new wings in 1989. One of these, C wing, was assigned to young prisoners between the ages of 17 and 21, with a maximum accommodation of 37 prisoners spread between 19 single cells and 2 dormitories. Later, the dormitories were altered to serve as a dining room and exercise room, and the single rooms reassigned to adults. The other wing, D, was designed to hold 15 female prisoners in 5 single cells and 2 dormitories, though the maximum number of places permitted was then reduced to 11.

In spite of the expansion, criticism mounted over overcrowding and human rights issues until in July 2005, Tynwald backed the construction of a new, larger secure facility at Jurby that would be better outfitted to rehabilitate prisoners. The new Isle of Man Prison was opened in August 2008 when all inmates from Victoria Road were transferred to the new prison. A month later, the Home affairs Minister Adrian Earnshaw MHK signed the paperwork which revoked the Custody Act 1995, which designated the building as a gaol, bringing Victoria Roads' active use as a prison to a close after period of 117 years.

Immediately after the decommissioning of Victoria Road Prison, the building was opened up for public tours during September and October 2008. Former acting prison governor Tony Hawkes who retired in June 2008 after 34 years' service lead the tours of the prison which included a visit to various wings and cells, as well as the search room and segregation unit. The tours were extremely popular, with places being fully booked within just hours of being advertised. Public interest in the old prison led to calls to open up the Victoria Road site as a permanent visitor attraction over the summer months.

In May 2010, the exercise yard of the former prison was used for an 'Urban Street Sport' event. The event included football skills competitions and demonstrations of free running. In June 2010, it was announced that artefacts from the former gaol sold in a public auction had raised £8,800. A month later, the former prison was used as a set location for the British horror film Slasher House.

In October 2010, the Department of Home Affairs applied for planning permission to demolish Victoria Road Prison. The department cited a survey which indicated that parts of the gatehouse and cell blocks of the former prison had deteriorated so that public access could not be allowed. However, in January 2011 it emerged that the Isle of Man Government was considering listing the former gaol on a register of buildings of "special architectural or historic interest", meaning that it would be saved from demolition.

In January 2012, Tim Crookall MHK suggested that there were concerns that listing some of the buildings of the former prison could prevent the site from being redeveloped for other uses. In November 2012, the Department of Home Affairs confirmed that demolition works had started at the former prison site, with completion planned for March 2013. The buildings have now been demolished, and in October 2014 the Isle of Man Government published plans for the redevelopment of the site, with sheltered accommodation, affordable housing and a church amongst ideas for the site. The government received many complaints regarding the demolition of the site. It could have been a Victorian prison museum which would have been very popular.
