= Ber nebo neber =

Ber nebo neber is the Czech Republic version of the television game snow Deal or No Deal. It aired on TV Prima from February 11, 2007 to December 27, 2008. The show, hosted by Pavel Zuna, is filmed on a set similar to the United States set and uses the music from that version, but uses the case opening cue when a low amount is opened from the Canadian version. Players can win as little as 1 Kč (Czech koruna) (about 4¢ US, €0.04, 3p, and ¥4.5) to as much as 5,000,000 Kč (about US$197,000, €185,000, £160,000, and ¥22,500,000).

== Gameplay ==
The game began with three contestants at three quiz podiums. In that situation, one of the contestants had to answer three questions correctly to proceed into the main game. For the new season, the host calls out the contestant's name, and the contestant comes to the stage. The contestant must choose one of 26 cases, with hopes of having the highest value. All contestants must eliminate a specific number of cases per round:

- Round 1: 6 cases to open
- Round 2: 5 cases to open
- Round 3: 4 cases to open
- Round 4: 3 cases to open
- Round 5: 2 cases to open
- Final four rounds consist of one case to open each round

After the selection of cases for each round, the banker (who is above the studio) will call down to the host using a phone on the podium, giving the contestant a bank offer. The host then opens a button cover at the center of the podium. The contestant can choose to push the metal button and take the offer or close the cover and continue the game. If the contestant takes the offer prior to the final round, the game continues to see if the contestant has a lower amount in his/her case. If the contestant rejects the final offer, the contestant will be allowed to keep their case or switch their case for the remaining case in play. The contestant then wins the amount that is in their case. The case is revealed to the audience when the amount in the case is lower than the offer or when the contestant wins any of the three top prizes, and the contestant opens the case when the case amount is higher than the bank offer, just like in the Estonian version of the show.

== Case values ==
Kč 1	Kč 10,000
Kč 2	Kč 20,000
Kč 5	Kč 30,000
Kč 10	Kč 40,000
Kč 20	Kč 50,000
Kč 50	Kč 100,000
Kč 100	Kč 250,000
Kč 200	Kč 500,000
Kč 500	Kč 750,000
Kč 1,000	Kč 1,000,000
Kč 2,000	Kč 1,500,000
Kč 5,000	Kč 2,500,000
Kč 7,500	Kč 5,000,000

== Winners ==
The biggest winners include:

- Marek Miška from Kladno, who won 1,700,000 Kč on the episode aired on November 4, 2007.
- Jana Antonínová from Litvínov, who won 1,300,000 Kč on the episode aired on June 24, 2007.
- Antonín Kocourek, the winner of 930,000 Kč on the February 25, 2007 episode. He was also the first contestant to have the case with the top prize.
- A female contestant on May 25, 2008, who won 1,500,000 Kč. Her last four cases had four biggest amounts in play.
