= Jordan Ramos =

British athlete

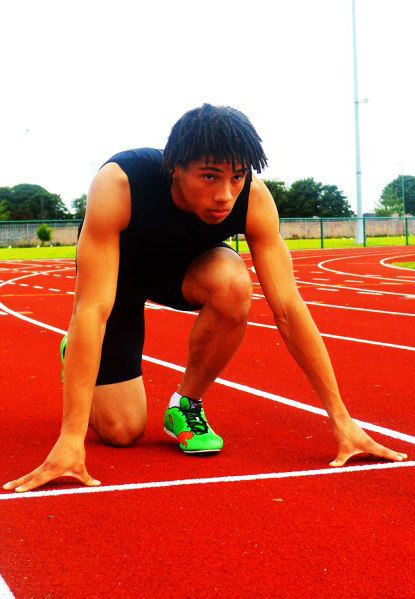
- Ramos preparing to race

Personal information
- Nationality: (United Kingdom) British, Brazilian
- Born: 18 July 1995 (age 30) Rio de Janeiro, Brazil

Sport
- Country: United Kingdom
- Sport: Track and Field, gymnastics
- Event(s): 60 metres, 100 metres, 200 metres, Tumbling (gymnastics)
- Club: Liverpool Harriers & Athletic Club, Wakefield Gymnastic Club
- Coached by: Alan Prescott, Craig Lowther
- Retired: 2010

Achievements and titles
- World finals: 2009 Russia 4th place Tumbling (gymnastics); 2007 Canada 6th place Tumbling (gymnastics)
Medal record
Representing United Kingdom
International Tumbling (gymnastics) Championships
Gold medal – first place	2008 Portugal	Tumbling (gymnastics)
Gold medal – first place	2007 Poland	Tumbling (gymnastics)
Bronze medal – third place	2006 Bulgaria	Tumbling (gymnastics)
European Championships
Silver medal – second place	Tumbling Team 2010 France	Tumbling (gymnastics)
National Championships
Gold medal – first place	2005 British open Championships	Tumbling (gymnastics)
Gold medal – first place	2005 British; Tumbling Championships	Tumbling (gymnastics)
Silver medal – second place	2006 British open Championships	Tumbling (gymnastics)
Gold medal – first place	2006 British; Tumbling Championships	Tumbling (gymnastics)
Silver medal – second place	2007 British open Championships	Tumbling (gymnastics)
Bronze medal – third place	2007 British; Tumbling Championships	Tumbling (gymnastics)
Gold medal – first place	2008 British; Tumbling Championships	Tumbling (gymnastics)
Gold medal – first place	2009 British; Tumbling Championships	Tumbling (gymnastics)
Silver medal – second place	2010 British; Tumbling Championships	Tumbling (gymnastics)
Regional Championships
Gold medal – first place	2006 Yorkshire Tumbling Championships	Tumbling (gymnastics)
Gold medal – first place	2006 (5 region Championships)	Tumbling (gymnastics)

Jordan Ramos (born 18 July 1995 in Rio de Janeiro, Brazil) is a British sprinter, former British Gymnast, five-times British Tumbling (gymnastics) Champion, a European Silver Medallist, a Guinness World Records Breaker for the longest slam dunk from a trampoline.

== Biography ==
Ramos is the son of Brazilian stuntman "Marcelo The Daredevil" and acrobat and keep-fit instructor Anita Grosvenor Ramos. He is their eldest son, with two younger brothers. He participates in the family act The Ramos Acrobats alongside his parents and one brother.

== Sports ==
=== Gymnastics ===
Ramos began training gymnastics and acrobatics with his father at the age of 2, and by the time he had reached his 10th birthday he became a British tumbling champion. Ramos has represented Great Britain in two World Junior Championships and one European Championship. He has ranked in the top six in two of the World Tumbling Championships, and won a gold medal at the Loulé Cup in Portugal in 2007. He won a silver European medal in France in 2010.

== Reality TV ==
=== Guinness world record broken ===
In 2008 he was set a challenge by Sky1 to try to beat the record for the longest slam dunk performed from a trampoline. He rose to the challenge and live on TV at Pinewood Studio, Ramos became the Guinness World Record Breaker. He held onto the record for three years, performing on programs such as Blue Peter, China Central Television and Italian television. In 2011 he entered the Guinness Book of Records.

=== Wife Swap appearance ===
On 29 June 2009, Ramos, his parents and brother appeared on the last series of the British program Wife Swap on Channel 4.
