= Vingtaine de la Moye =

Vingtaine in Saint Brélade, Jersey

Vingtaine de la Moye la Moye
- Vingtaine
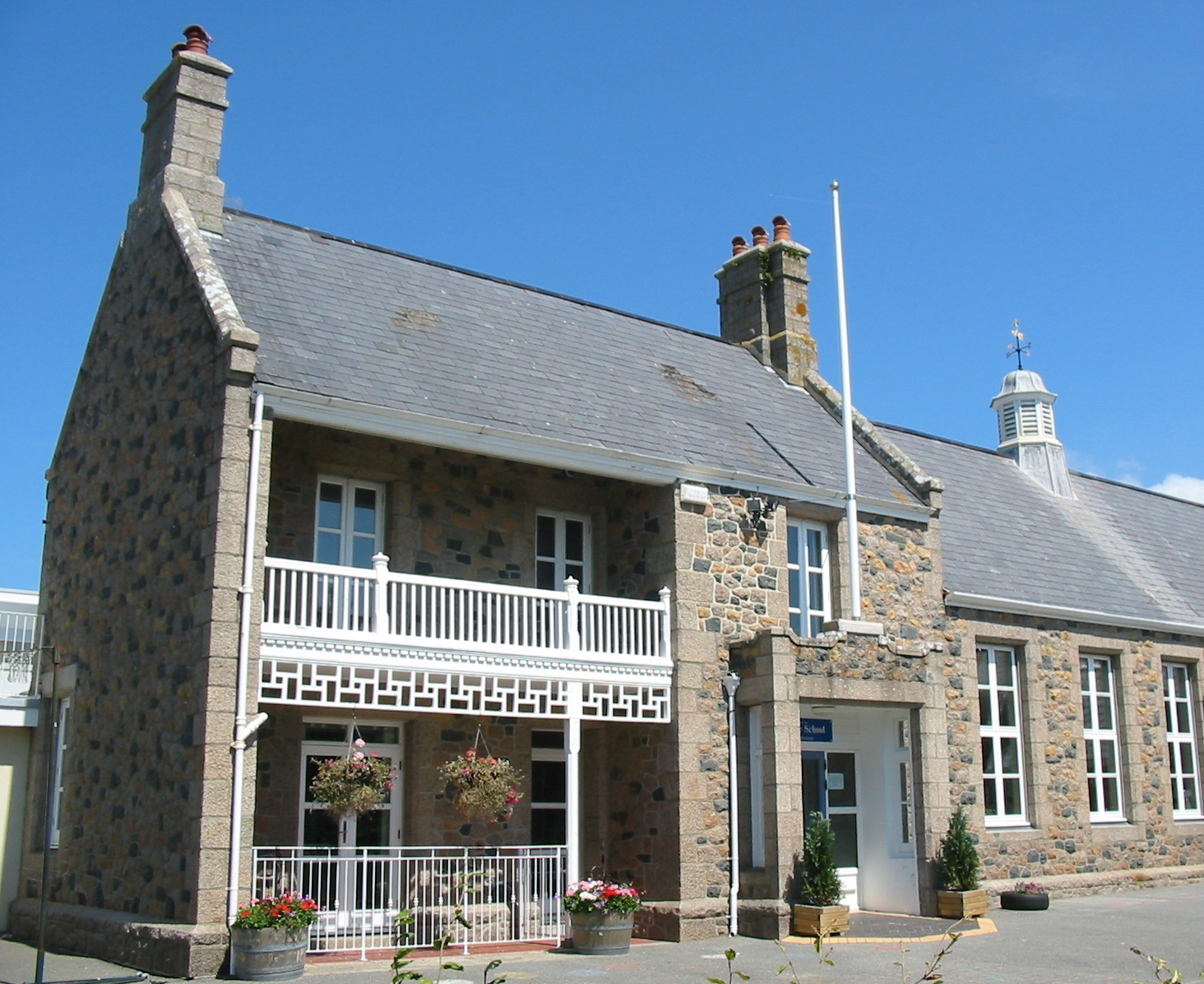
- la Moye primary school

- Location within Jersey Location within Channel Islands
- Coordinates: 49°10′59″N 2°13′24″W
- Country: Jersey
- Parish: Saint Brelade

Population (January 1, 2021)
  - Total: 2,161
- Time zone: UTC+00:00
- Postal code: JE3–8BS

Vingtaine de la Moye (Jèrriais: "La Vîngtaine d'la Mouaie") is one of the four vingtaines of the Parish of St. Brélade in Jersey in the Channel Islands.

Together with the Vingtaine des Quennevais it forms part of an electoral district known as "St. Brélade No. 2" into which the Parish is divided for the purpose of the electoral register and conduct of the poll and counting, but since reforms of 2021-2022 the Deputies for St Brelade are elected for the whole Parish and not for the electoral district.

Jersey's Prison is situated at La Moye. Also within the boundaries of the vingtaine are:

- La Corbière
- St Brelade's Church and the Fisherman's Chapel at the western end of St Brelade's Bay
- La Pulente at the southern end of St Ouen's Bay
- a number of megalithic sites, including the dolmen at La Sergenté and La Table des Marthes
- the desalination plant
- La Lande du Ouest, a Site of Special Interest
- La Moye School
