= HMS Rushen Castle =

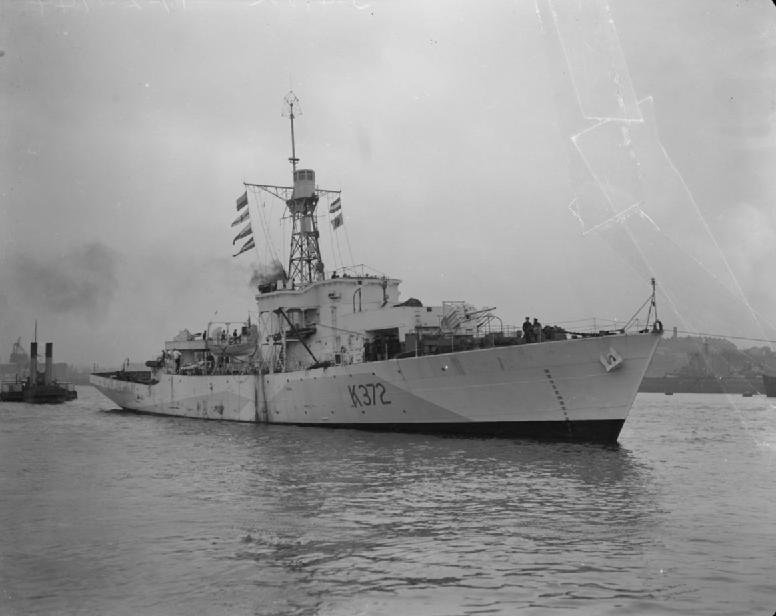
- Rushen Castle on the River Tyne, February 1944

History

United Kingdom
- Name: Rushen Castle
- Namesake: Castle Rushen
- Builder: Swan Hunter & Wigham Richardson, Wallsend
- Launched: 16 July 1943
- Commissioned: 23 February 1944
- Identification: Pennant number: K372
- Fate: Sold to British Air Ministry, 26 September 1960

United Kingdom
- Name: Weather Surveyor
- Acquired: 26 September 1960
- Commissioned: 21 December 1961
- Identification: IMO number: 5387180
- Fate: Sold on July 1977 and converted to a salvage vessel. Scrapped, 1982

General characteristics
- Class & type: Castle-class corvette
- Displacement: 1,010 long tons (1,030 t) (standard); 1,510 long tons (1,530 t) (deep load)
- Length: 252 ft (76.8 m)
- Beam: 33 ft (10.1 m)
- Draught: 14 ft (4.3 m)
- Installed power: 2 Admiralty 3-drum boilers; 2,880 ihp (2,150 kW)
- Propulsion: 2 shafts, 2 geared steam turbines
- Speed: 16.5 knots (30.6 km/h; 19.0 mph)
- Range: 6,500 nmi (12,000 km; 7,500 mi) at 15 knots (28 km/h; 17 mph)
- Complement: 99
- Sensors & processing systems: Type 145 and Type 147 ASDIC; Type 277 search radar; HF/DF radio direction finder
- Armament: 1 × single 4 in (102 mm) gun; 2 × twin, 2 × single 20 mm (0.8 in) AA guns; 1 × 3-barrel Squid anti-submarine mortar; 15 × depth charges, 1 rack and 2 throwers

HMS Rushen Castle (K372) was a Castle-class corvette built for the Royal Navy during the Second World War. Completed in 1944, the ship escorted convoys to and from Gibraltar and the UK. After the surrender of Germany in May 1945, she served on air-sea rescue duties in British waters. Rushen Castle was reduced to reserve in 1946. She was sold to the Air Ministry in 1960 and her conversion into a weather ship was finished the following year. The ship was renamed Weather Surveyor at that time. She was sold out of service in 1977 and converted into a salvage vessel. The ship was sold for scrap in 1982 and broken up in Germany.

== Design and description ==
The Castle-class corvette was a stretched version of the preceding Flower class, enlarged to improve seakeeping and to accommodate modern weapons. The ships displaced 1,010 long tons (1,030 t) at standard load and 1,510 long tons (1,530 t) at deep load. The ships had an overall length of 252 feet (76.8 m), a beam of 36 feet 9 inches (11.2 m) and a deep draught of 13 feet 9 inches (4.2 m). They were powered by a four-cylinder triple-expansion steam engine driving one propeller shaft using steam provided by two Admiralty three-drum boilers. The engine developed a total of 2,880 indicated horsepower (2,150 kW) and gave a speed of 16.5 knots (30.6 km/h; 19.0 mph). The Castles carried enough fuel oil to give them a range of 6,500 nautical miles (12,000 km; 7,500 mi) at 15 knots (28 km/h; 17 mph). The ships' complement was 99 officers and ratings.

The Castle-class ships were equipped with a single QF 4-inch (102 mm) Mk XVI dual-purpose gun forward, but their primary weapon was their single three-barrel Squid anti-submarine mortar. This was backed up by one depth charge rail and two throwers for 15 depth charges. The ships were fitted with two twin and a pair of single mounts for 20-millimetre (0.8 in) Oerlikon AA guns. Provision was made for a further four single mounts if needed. They were equipped with Type 145Q and Type 147B ASDIC sets to detect submarines by reflections from sound waves beamed into the water. A Type 272 search radar and a HF/DF radio direction finder rounded out the Castles' sensor suite.

== Construction and career ==
Ordered on 6 February 1943, Rushen Castle was laid down at Swan Hunter & Wigham Richardson at their shipyard in Wallsend on 8 April. The ship was launched on 16 July and completed on 24 February 1944. After several weeks of training in Western Approaches Command's Anti-Submarine Training School at Tobermory, Mull, she was assigned to Escort Group B2 on 16 March on the Gibraltar-UK route. Rushen Castle remained on this route despite being transferred to Escort Group B21 in September and then to the Liverpool Escort Group in December. The ship's last convoy reached port on 27 June 1945, even though Germany had surrendered on 8 May. Rushen Castle was then assigned to Plymouth Command for air-sea rescue duties. The ship was refitted from October 1945 to January 1946 and was then reduced to reserve at Devonport.

She received a brief refit from 24 September to 2 October 1947 when the Royal Navy was thinking to offering her to the Royal New Zealand Navy, but that service opted for larger Loch-class frigates instead. Rushen Castle was offered to the Air Ministry in 1956 for use as a weather ship, but was not sold until 23 September 1960. Her conversion was completed at Blyth on November 1961 and she was renamed Weather Surveyor. She was sold in July 1977 and converted to a salvage vessel. The ship was departed under tow on 11 May 1982 to be scrapped in Germany.

== Bibliography ==
- Campbell, N. J. M. (1980). "Great Britain (including Empire Forces)". In Chesneau, Roger (ed.). Conway's All the World's Fighting Ships 1922–1946. Conway Maritime Press. pp. 2–85. ISBN 0-85177-146-7.
- Colledge, J. J.; Warlow, Ben & Bush, Steve (2020). Ships of the Royal Navy: The Complete Record of all Fighting Ships of the Royal Navy from the 15th Century to the Present (5th revised and updated ed.). Seaforth Publishing. ISBN 978-1-5267-9327-0.
- Goodwin, Norman; compiled by (2007). Castle Class Corvettes: An Account of the Service of the Ships and of Their Ships' Companies. Maritime Books. ISBN 978-1-904459-27-9.
- Lenton, H. T. (1998). British & Empire Warships of the Second World War. Naval Institute Press. ISBN 1-55750-048-7.
- Warwick, Colin, 1997. Really Not Required, Pentland Press, ISBN 1858214777
