= James Brown (Isle of Man) =

British printer, editor and activist (1815–1881)

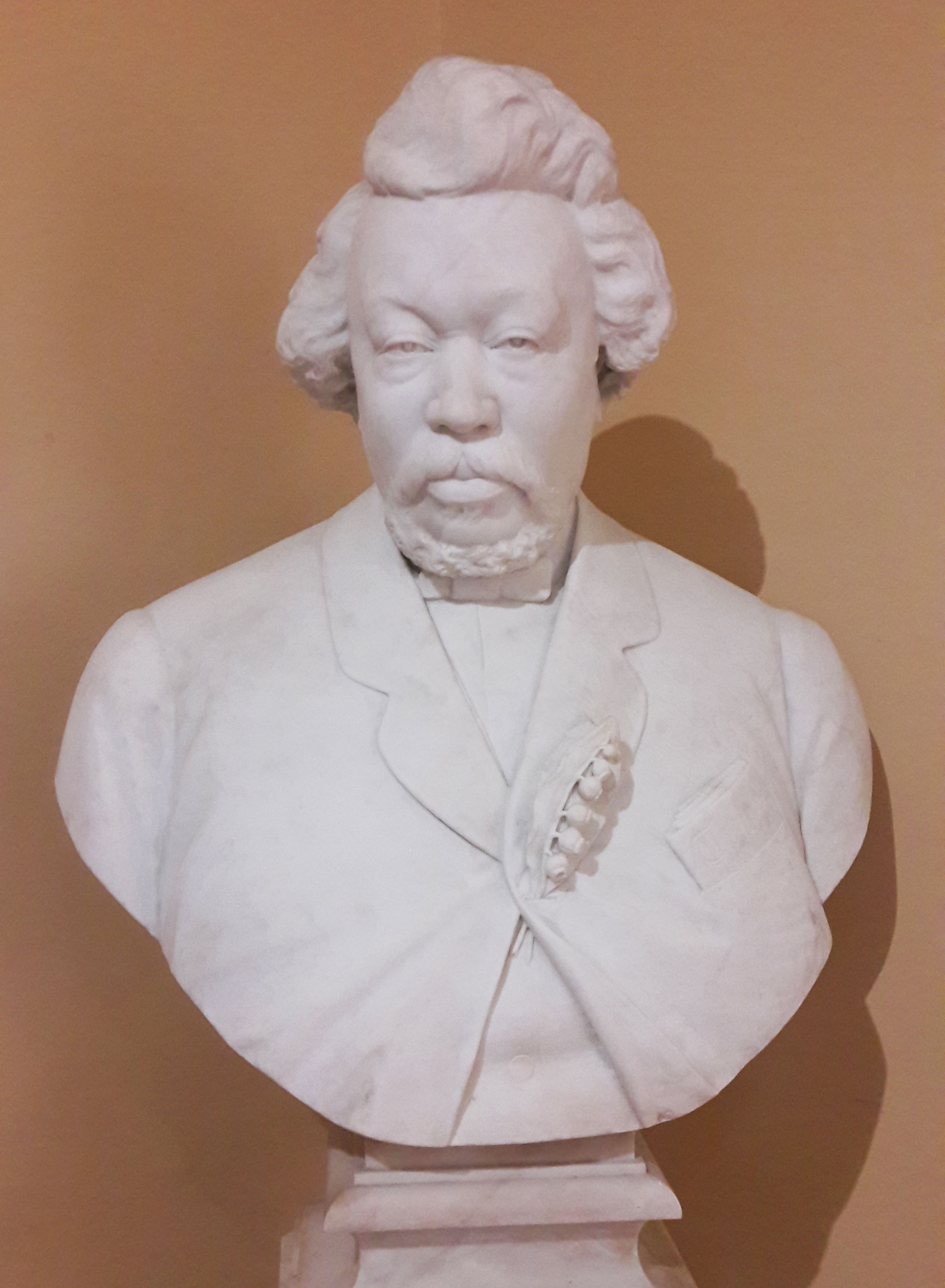
- Marble bust of James Brown
- Born: 2 August 1815; Liverpool, United Kingdom
- Died: 3 December 1881 (aged 66); Douglas, Isle of Man
- Resting place: Kirk Braddan Cemetery
- Occupations: Printer, publisher
- Spouse: Eleanor Jane (married 1837-1864) Isabella Bromley (married 1865)
- Children: 8

James Brown (2 August 1815 – 12 March 1881) was a British printer, editor and political activist. Born in Liverpool, he moved to Douglas, Isle of Man, in 1846 where he founded The Isle of Man Times newspaper and played an important role in the democratisation of the island's House of Keys.

== Early life ==
Brown's father Daniel Brown married Elizabeth Gough in December 1810 at Holy Trinity Church, Liverpool. Elizabeth was from a family of merchants while Daniel, a mariner, was likely the son of Cato Brown. In 1920, when his son John recounted his family history, he recalled Cato as James's father, a freed slave who had settled in Liverpool via Nova Scotia, after a career in the Royal Navy where he claimed he had served with Nelson at the Battle of Trafalgar on HMS Victory. However, later genealogical research showed that his father was Daniel and it was assumed Cato was his grandfather. When James was baptised in 1815 at St Peter's Church, Liverpool, his father's career was recorded as blacksmith. He had an older brother, John.

Brown was educated at Liverpool Blue Coat School. He was then apprenticed to the printer George Wood of Price Street, going on to work in the print rooms of various Liverpool newspapers including the Liverpool Mercury. During his time in Liverpool, he sang in choirs and was known for his bass voice. He ran a pub, the Concert Tavern, in Beau Street. In 1837 he married Eleanor Jane McKenzie in St Peter's Church and their eldest son, John Archibald Brown, was born in 1839. The family moved to the Isle of Man, Eleanor's birthplace, in 1846.

== Publishing career ==
Brown worked as a compositor at the Liverpool Mercury until he was invited to the Isle of Man in 1846 to work on the National Reformer, a paper run by Bronterre O'Brien At the time, the Isle of Man was home to many printing houses, due in part to low taxes and a loophole which meant that any newspapers printed there could be sent to the United Kingdom free of postage costs. However, in 1848 this privilege ended, and many newspapers closed. Unemployed, Brown borrowed £30 and established his own printers in Duke Lane. He began publishing The Manx Lion, which became known for its "daring criticisms of local politics", but this folded after just three months, when, according to his son John, the advertising salesman walked off with most of the earnings.

On 1 February 1849, the first edition of Brown's Advertising Circular was published. It was distributed freely and relied on advertisements for income. However, Brown and his son had ambitions to produce the island's newspaper of record, and merged their free paper into the Isle of Man Times and General Advertiser on 4 May 1861. The title had been used before, but the earlier title had folded in 1849. From the very first issue of the Times, Brown set out its radical and independent tone: "Many reforms are needed in the machinery of the legislature and government of this island, and we shall most strenuously urge these reforms upon the highest officials." The Isle of Man Times published the early verse of T. E. Brown from 1871, also serialising his poem Betsy Lee, as well as novels by Hall Caine.

His son John Archibald Brown also edited The Times and in 1868 became a full partner of the firm James Brown & Sons, whose office was at 9 Athol Street, Douglas.

== Criticism of the House of Keys and imprisonment ==
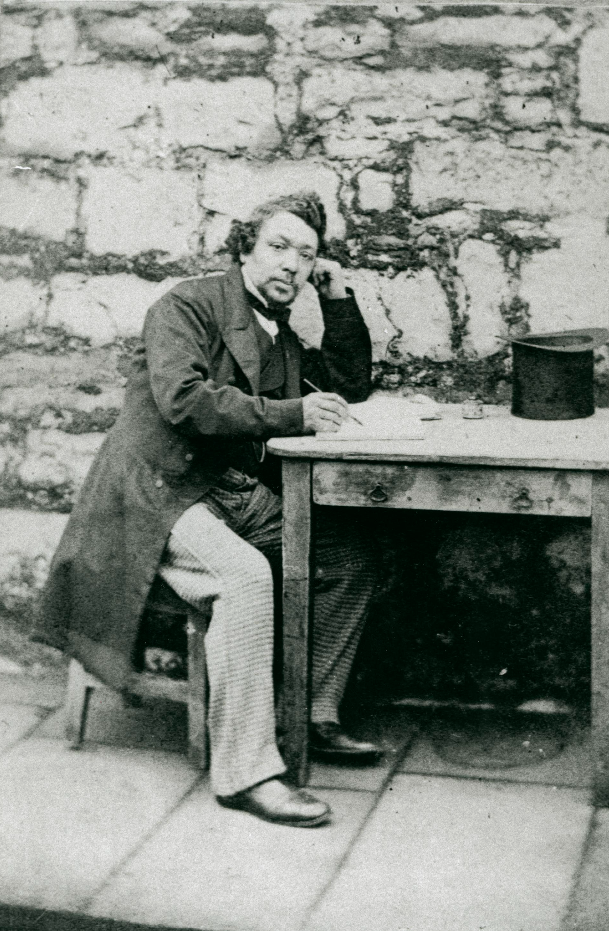
Brown imprisoned in Castle Rushen Gaol, 1864

At the start of the 1860s, the Isle of Man's parliament, the Tynwald consisted of an upper house of Town Commissioners and the self appointed House of Keys. In 1863 the Town Commissioners applied for more powers, but were rejected by the House of Keys. Brown wrote critical articles that led to him being seen as a champion of democratic rights, while attracting the ire of the House of Keys. When a member of House of Keys suggested the Commissioners should be allowed powers over the donkeys on the beach, Brown published a remark that said "this elicited marks of approval from the donkeys around him".

On 16 March 1864, Brown was summoned to the House of Keys to answer the charge of a "contempt and breach of its privileges" for publishing "libellous and scandalous" articles about the House. He was not permitted to speak via his legal counsel, Alfred Adams, and so instead addressed the House himself, reading lengthy passages from his newspaper in full. The House sentenced him to six months in prison and he was sent to the gaol of Castle Rushen where he kept a prison diary. On the same day, the editor of rival newspaper Mona's Herald, John Christian Fargher, was also summoned for similar charges, however, he issued an apology, promised to publish a retraction, and was let off with a warning.

Adams prepared a habeas corpus appeal to the Queen's Bench, who then found that the House of Keys, represented in London by James Gell, did not have the power to imprison Brown for contempt. On Saturday 7 May, after seven weeks' imprisonment, Adams and Gell sent telegraphs to the Island with the verdict, however, Brown decided to remain in prison for two further days, allowing time for his supporters to organise an appropriate welcome in Douglas. During his time in gaol, he received over 200 visitors and a wide range of gifts, including food and drink from local businesses. He later sued the House of Keys for wrongful imprisonment and was awarded £518, nineteen shillings and sixpence (about £55,000 in 2024 purchasing power), plus costs.

Three years after his imprisonment, the House of Keys became a democratically elected body and in his 1901 Manx Worthies, A. W. Moore noted that the name James Brown was usually associated with the reform of the House of Keys.

== Personal life ==
Six months after the death of his wife Eleanor, he married Isabella Bromley, Eleanor's niece. He suffered a stroke and retired in 1877 and died on 12 March 1881. Brown was a freemason for 23 years and lodge secretary for eight.
