= Výměna manželek =

- Genre: Reality
- Country of origin: Czech Republic
- Original language: Czech

Original release
- Network: TV Nova
- Release: 2005 – present

Výměna manželek is the Czech version of the reality television show Wife Swap, which originated in the United Kingdom. It has aired since 2005 on TV Nova, and as of 2023 is the longest-running continuous version of Wife Swap in the world.

The show follows a similar format to other Wife Swap versions, with two families swapping wives for ten days. LGBT families have also been included.

== Notable episodes ==
A 2009 episode swapped a wife from Brno with a wife from a Czech diaspora family in Paraguay.

A 2015 episode prompted one of the families to be referred to social services after it was revealed that the children lacked basic hygiene habits such as teeth brushing and hand washing.

A wife from a 2017 episode who brought a snake to the table meeting became nationally recognizable after she told her partner "Mačkáš mi hada, debile" ("You're squeezing my snake, moron").

Another 2017 episode caused controversy for featuring a couple with a 17-year-old wife and 45-year-old husband. The pair had met when the wife was 14. The husband was called a "pedophile" by the other family's husband at the table meeting.

Two episodes have ended in brawls between husbands. The first, in 2013, came after one husband accused the other's wife of being lazy. The second, in 2020, involved an abusive husband who pushed around his substitute wife, and her husband attacked him upon hearing the news.

In 2024, the first episode with a transgender participant aired, where the partner of one of the wives was in the process of transitioning to female.

== Controversies ==
The show has caused controversy within the Czech Republic, with some critics saying it takes advantage of families who need the prize money.

Following a taping in 2020, one of the participants, a 42-year-old police officer from the Opava District, committed suicide. The officer's sons alleged that the producers of the show had tried to provoke conflict by repeatedly pressuring him to make racist comments toward his Romani substitute wife. In April 2025, an Opava District court found the show's director liable for the death.

== Format change ==
In 2025, in response to concerns about the impact on children who participated in the program, TV Nova announced a format change which would make the show focused on solving family issues positively, including with the help of experts.
