= Castle Rushen =

Medieval castle in Castletown, Isle of Man

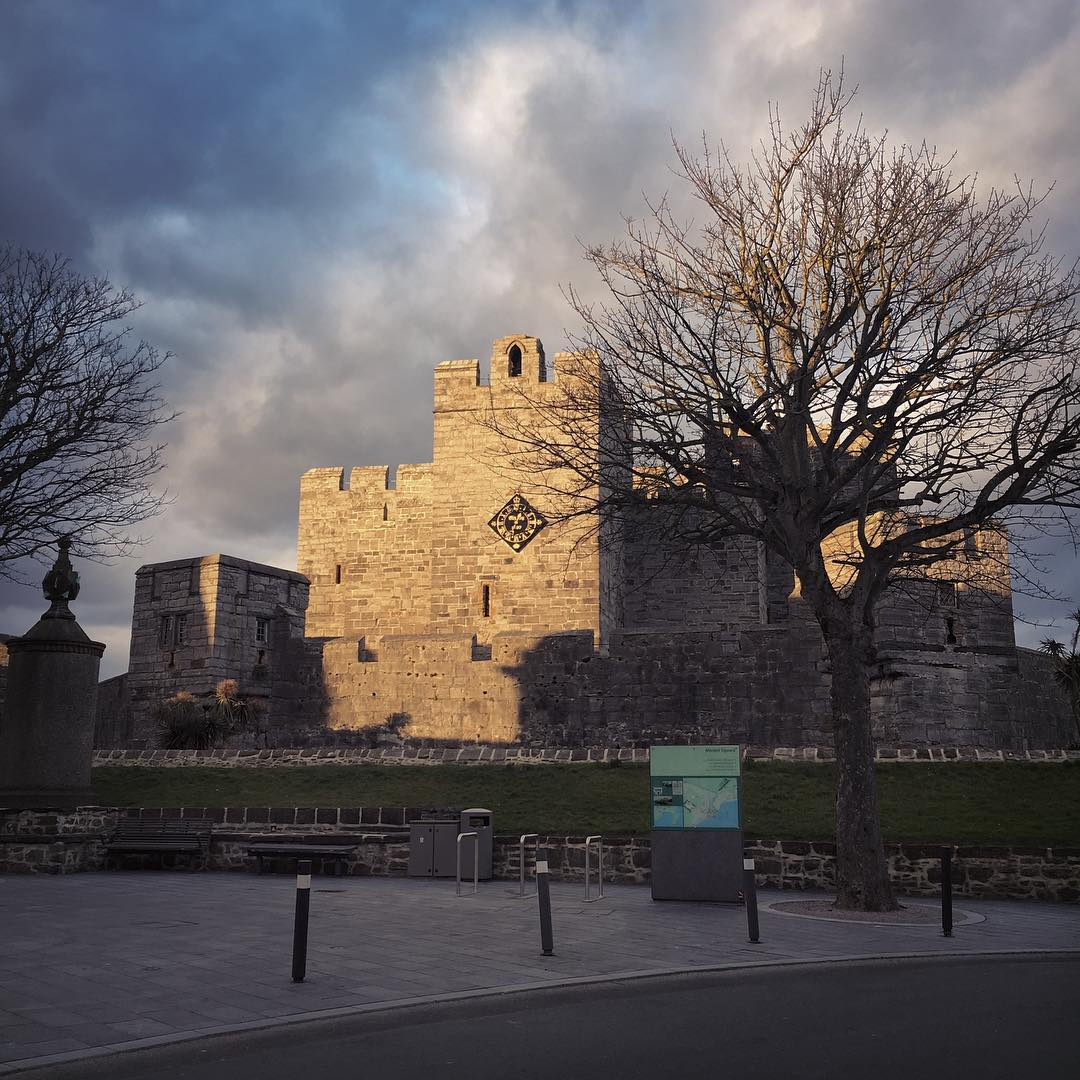
- Castle Rushen as seen from Castletown's market square.
- Interactive map of the Castle Rushen area

General information
- Location: Castletown, Isle of Man
- Completed: 16th century

Design and construction
- Architect: Several

Castle Rushen (Manx: Cashtal Rosien) is a medieval castle located in the Isle of Man's historic capital, Castletown, in the south of the Island. It towers over the Market Square to the south-east and the harbour to the north-east. The castle is amongst the best examples of medieval castles in Europe and is still in use as a museum and educational centre.

== Construction ==
Construction is thought to have taken place during the 10th-century reigns of rulers of the Isle of Man – the Kings of Mann and the Isles. An old oak beam was found in the castle in the mid-19th century that contained the date 947. The last such King of Man, Magnús Óláfsson, is recorded in the Chronicle of Mann to have died at the castle in 1265. The original Castle Rushen consisted of a central square stone tower, or keep. The site was fortified to guard the entrance to the Silver Burn. The castle was developed by successive rulers of Man between the 13th and 16th centuries. The limestone walls dominated much of the surrounding landscape, serving as a point of dominance for various rulers of the Isle of Man. By 1313, the original keep was reinforced with towers to the west and south. In the 14th century, an east tower, gatehouses, and curtain wall were added.

== Make-up of the castle ==
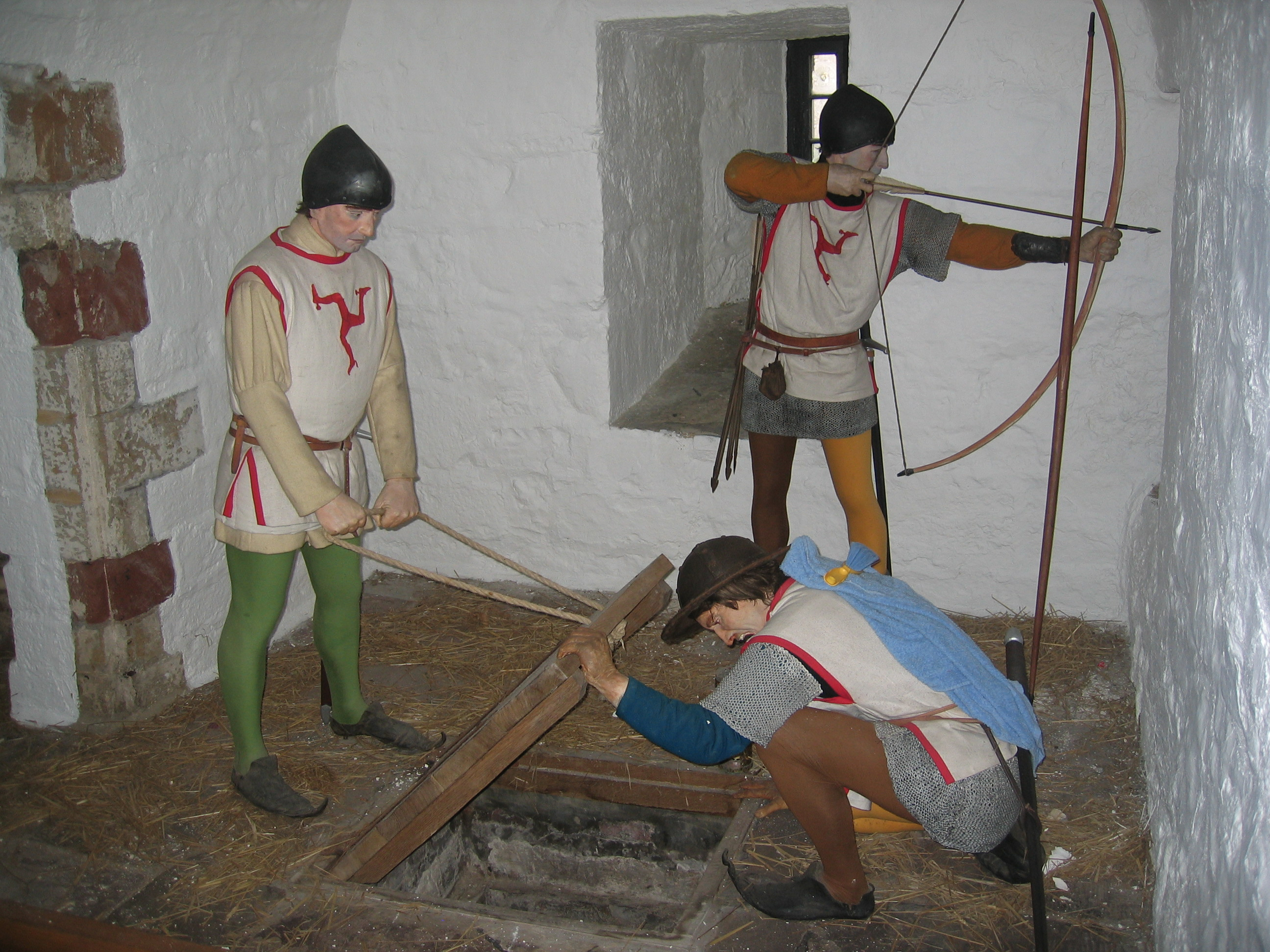
Castle Rushen's portcullis chamber with so-called murder holes to attack intruders trapped between the two portcullises

The keep of Castle Rushen's first line of defence is an outer wall, 25 feet (7.6 m) high and 7 feet (2.1 m) thick. Attached to the wall are five towers, which in the post-defensive era of Castle Rushen were used for civilian administrative functions. The keep itself has walls 12 feet (3.7 m) thick at the base and 7 feet (2.1 m) thick at the top. Four towers sit atop the keep, the main one in the north rising to a height of 80 feet (24 m) and other three to around 70 feet (21 m).

The entrance to the keep is protected by a drawbridge and a fortified inner gatehouse entrance with two portcullises with a killing area between them covered by three so-called murder holes, through which the defenders could attack any intruders trapped between the two portcullises. On either side of the gatehouse are located guardhouses, which were converted into prison cells in the later history of the castle. When on duty, the garrison would spend most of its time in the gatehouses. Inside the gatehouse is a lower level with a tide mill for grinding corn. The castle also included a medieval chapel, housing Castle Rushen's clock mechanism. The still functioning Castle Rushen clock is a notable landmark in Castletown, having been presented by Queen Elizabeth I of England in 1597, while she controlled the Island during a dispute. The outer parts of the castle are protected by a moat and a glacis, with the glacis originally extending as far as the moat around the entire land front of Castle Rushen.

== History ==
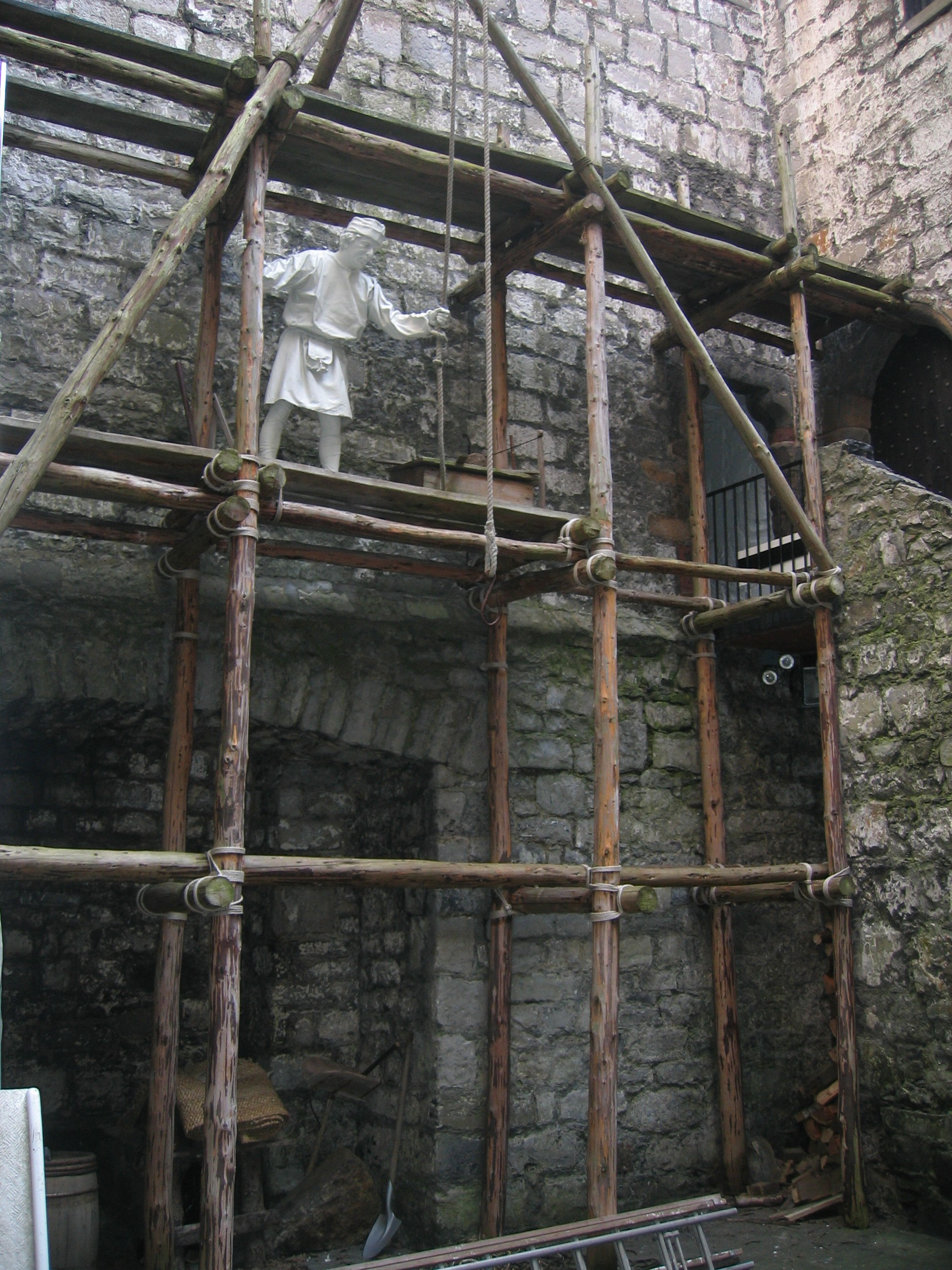
Construction work exhibition at Castle Rushen

=== Changing hands between the Scots and English ===
After its initial construction and use by the Norse-Gaelic rulers of the Isle of Man, the castle changed hands repeatedly between the Scots and the English. The Isle of Man was transferred to Scotland the year after Magnús Óláfsson's death as part of the Treaty of Perth, ending the 1263–1266 Scottish–Norwegian War. On 18 May 1313, with the help of his friend, Angus Og Macdonald, Lord of the isles and his fleet, the Scottish king Robert the Bruce invaded the Isle of Man at Ramsey. The Island was captured in five days, the only resistance occurring at Castle Rushen, which was defended by Dungal MacDouall, who had once been Lord of Galloway and betrayed Robert Bruce's brothers, Alexander and Thomas, to Edward I who promptly had them executed as traitors. After a three-week siege, Robert captured the castle on 12 June 1313, gaining the Isle of Man as an outpost securing the approaches to western Scotland and the Hebrides.

After several more changes of hands the English and their supporters eventually prevailed. The English king Edward I Longshanks claimed that the Island had belonged to the Kings of England for generations and he was merely reasserting their rightful claim to the Isle of Man.

From 1405 to 1738 the Isle of Man was controlled by the Stanley family, beginning with Sir John Stanley, who was given the title of King of Mann by Henry IV of England in 1405. The title King of Mann was replaced in 1521 by the title Lord of Mann, held today by the reigning British monarch.

=== Castle Rushen in the English Civil War ===
During the English Civil War of 1642–1651 James Stanley, 7th Earl of Derby, the Lord of Mann from 1627 to 1651, sided with the Royalist cause. Known as The Great Stanley (Manx: Yn Stanlagh Mooar), James established a secondary Royalist court at Castle Rushen before leaving to fight the Parliamentarians in England. In August 1651 James sailed with two frigates, bringing 300 Royalists from the Isle of Man to meet Charles II in Lancashire. Having fought several battles during the Civil War's third phase, Lord Derby was captured at the Battle of Worcester on 3 September 1651 and executed at Bolton on 15 October 1651. When James left the Isle of Man he left his wife, Countess Charlotte – the renowned successful defender of Lathom House in 1644 – in command of the Isle of Man. The French-born Charlotte Stanley held Castle Rushen until a rebellion led by Manx nationalist Illiam Dhône (English: William Christian) and the mutiny of her own garrison forced her to surrender to invading Parliamentarian forces led by Colonel Robert Duckenfield by the end of October 1651.

== Non-military uses of the castle ==
=== Administrative centre ===
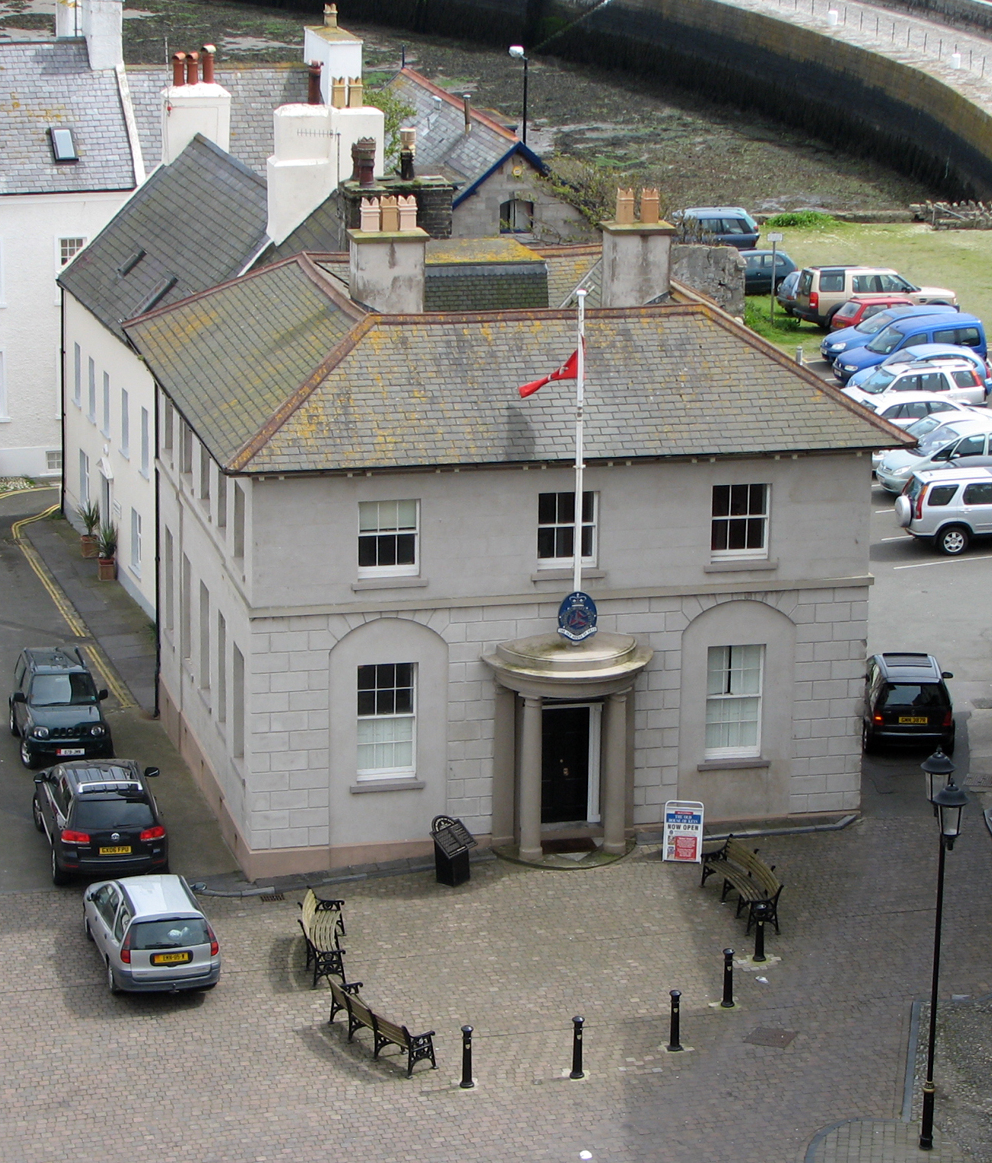
The Old House of Keys seen from Castle Rushen

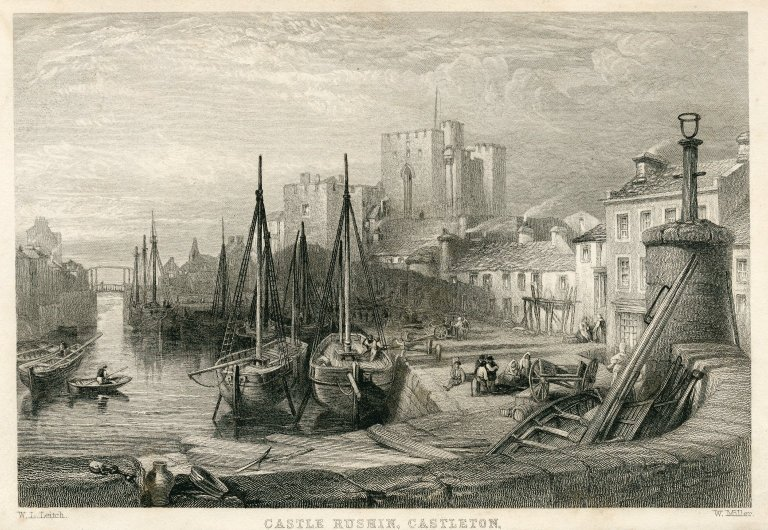
An engraving of Castle Rushen from the 1850s

As the defensive value of the Castle declined it was in continuous use as an administrative centre. In the 18th century a mint was located within its grounds, as was the still active southern law court of the Isle of Man. The Manx law books were also stored in The Lord's Treasury at Castle Rushen. The Castle was a meeting place in the 16th century for the 24 Keys – an early name for the Manx Parliament's lower house, the House of Keys. The Keys had no permanent residence until 1710, meeting on occasion at Castle Rushen. From 1710 the Keys met at the Bishop Wilson's library in Castletown before moving to a dedicated building (The Old House of Keys) in 1821. Since 1874 the House of Keys has been located in the Isle of Man's post-1869 capital of Douglas.

=== Prison ===
The 18th century saw the castle in steady decay. By the end of the century it was converted into a prison. Even though the castle was in continuous use as a prison, the decline continued until the turn of the 20th century, when it was restored under the oversight of the Lieutenant Governor, George Somerset, 3rd Baron Raglan. Following the restoration work, and the completion of the purpose-built Victoria Road Prison in 1891, the castle was transferred from the British Crown to the Isle of Man Government in 1929.

After the castle had lost its other uses as a defensive structure, political residence, and meeting place for the High Court of Tynwald and the legislative assembly, its use as a prison continued, prisoners being transferred from the crypt at Peel Castle in 1780. From 1765 fines were no longer used to support the castle's maintenance and heavy structural deterioration set in, exposing the prisoners to cold and poor weather. This led to protests by the 1777–1793 governor, a man named Smith, but to little avail. Only in 1813 and 1827 were the buildings renovated and converted for prison use. All inmates who were reasonably healthy were expected to perform forced labour, with set quotas for productivity.

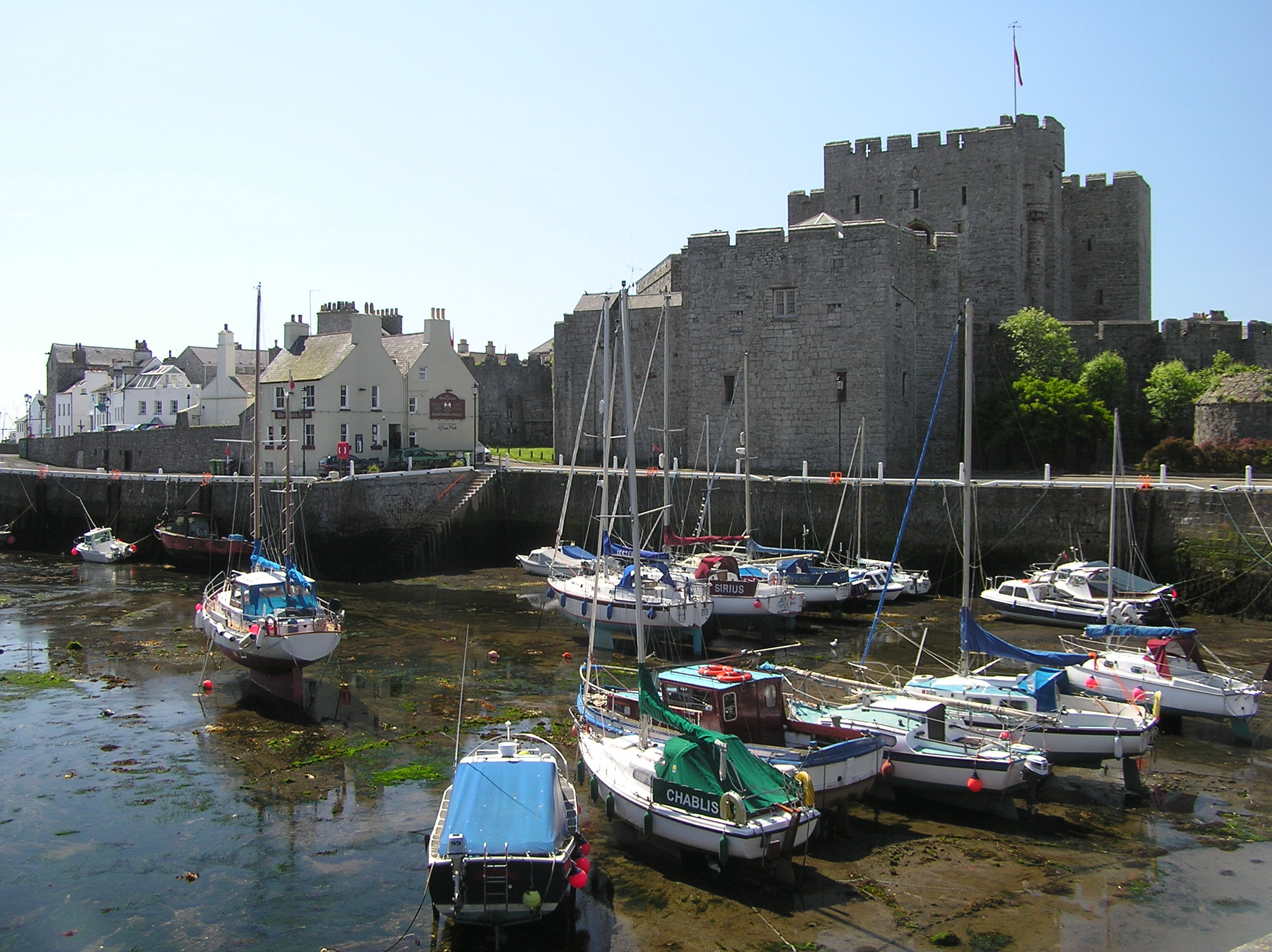
Castle Rushen seen across Castletown Harbour, the entrance to the Silverburn river. The Castle Arms pub is seen to the left of the castle.

By the 1880s the conditions in the castle had reached such a level of misery for the inmates that order broke down and separating the prisoners became impossible. After an 1885 inspection by the Chairman of the Commissioners for Prisons in England and Wales a report made the recommendation to build a new 30-inmate prison. After initial Tynwald opposition to the expense, a new site was chosen and the modern Victoria Road Prison opened in April 1891, having been designed by local Manx architect James Cowle.

During Castle Rushen's service as a prison it held both women and men, with children born by serving prisoners being allowed to live with their mothers within the prison walls, and was the site of executions. The last person executed in the castle grounds was John Kewish, convicted of patricide, who was hanged in the Debtors' Yard in the summer of 1872. Kewish's body was buried within the grounds of Castle Rushen.

One notable prisoner held for a time at Castle Rushen was the 1697–1755 Anglican Bishop of Sodor and Man, Thomas Wilson. Wilson was imprisoned in 1722 after a conflict with the 1702–1736 Lord of Mann, James Stanley, over who was to have authority over ecclesiastical court cases in the diocese of Sodor and Man. The 19th-century Manx democracy activists Robert Fargher and James Brown both spent time in the Castle Rushen jail as punishment for attacking the House of Keys as an undemocratic institution and demanding public elections in the Isle of Man.

In addition to holding criminals Castle Rushen was also used as an insane asylum, confining mentally ill patients. The criminally insane were not held in the Isle of Man, instead being sent to institutions in Scotland and England.

=== Manx National Heritage site ===
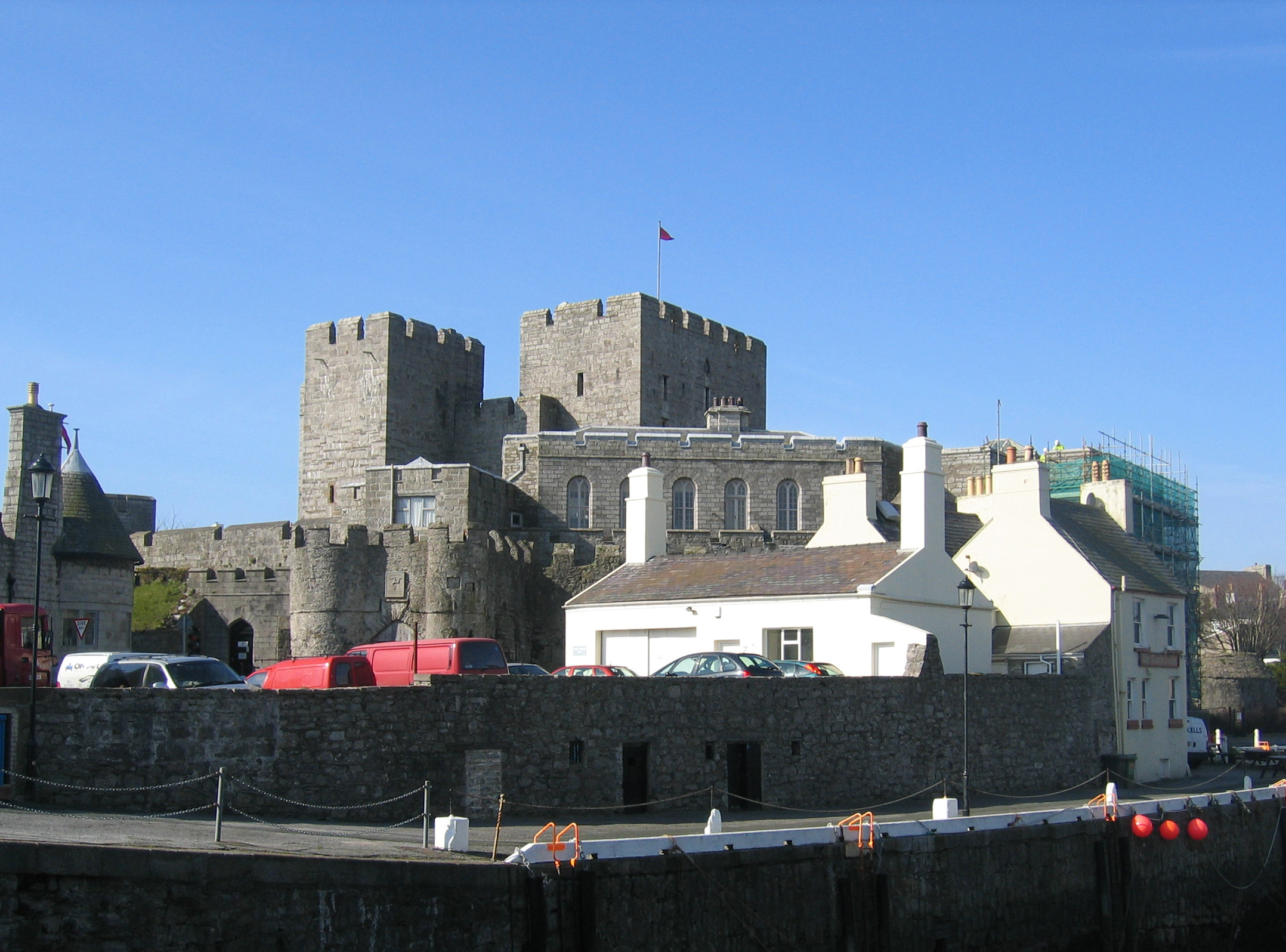
Castle Rushen, with the Castle Arms in the foreground

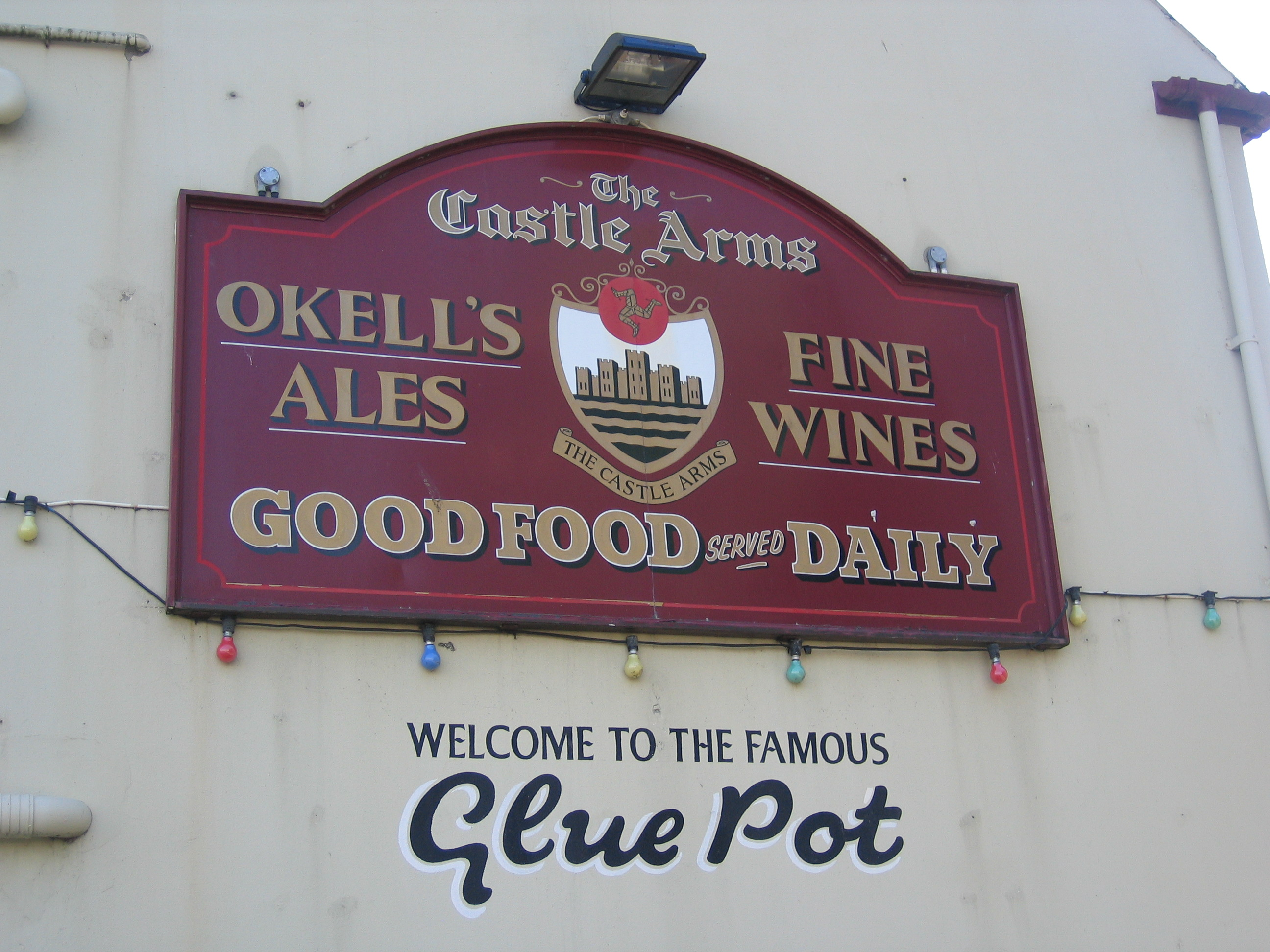
Pub sign of the Castle Arms

In 1988, control of the castle was handed over to Manx National Heritage for restoration, being opened in July 1991 by the Earl of Derby as the first major Manx heritage site. Castle Rushen is one of four Manx National Heritage sites in Castletown, the others being the Nautical Museum, The Old Grammar School and the Old House of Keys.

Today it is run as a museum by Manx National Heritage, depicting the history of the Kings and Lords of Mann. Most rooms are open to the public during the opening season (March to October), and all open rooms have signs telling their stories. The exhibitions include a working medieval kitchen where authentic period food is prepared on special occasions and re-enactments of various aspects of medieval life are held on a regular basis, with particular emphasis on educating the local children about their history. Archaeological finds made during excavations in the 1980s are displayed and used as learning tools for visitors. A centre of the school activities at Castle Rushen is the recreation of the preparations and events surrounding the May 1507 visit to the castle by Thomas Stanley, 2nd Earl of Derby and King of Mann. Stanley's visit in 1507 was a momentous occasion as most Kings of Mann rarely if ever visited the Island, leaving its government to lower-ranking officials. The exhibitions at Castle Rushen are part of the Manx National Heritage Story of Mann collection of cultural, historical and heritage sites and attractions. In addition to its function as a museum, the castle is still in use as an official court house.

Castle Rushen features on the reverse side of the Manx pound £5 notes issued by the Isle of Man Government. The Castle Rushen £5 note has the unusual feature of displaying a pub, the Castle Arms, opposite Castle Rushen.

The closing ceremony for the 2011 Commonwealth Youth Games, held in the Isle of Man, was held in Castletown's Market Square in front of Castle Rushen on 12 September 2011.

Castle Rushen also gives its name to Castletown's secondary state school, Castle Rushen High School.

During World War II a Castle-class corvette was named after Castle Rushen, HMS Rushen Castle.

The 28 miles (45 km) Millennium Way long-distance footpath, which opened in 1979, the 1000th anniversary year of Tynwald, starts at Castle Rushen before heading towards the northern Manx town of Ramsey. The footpath ends at the foot of Sky Hill around 1 mile (1.6 km) from the town square in Ramsey.

Castle Rushen is said to be haunted by a lady ghost, walking the castle drawbridge.

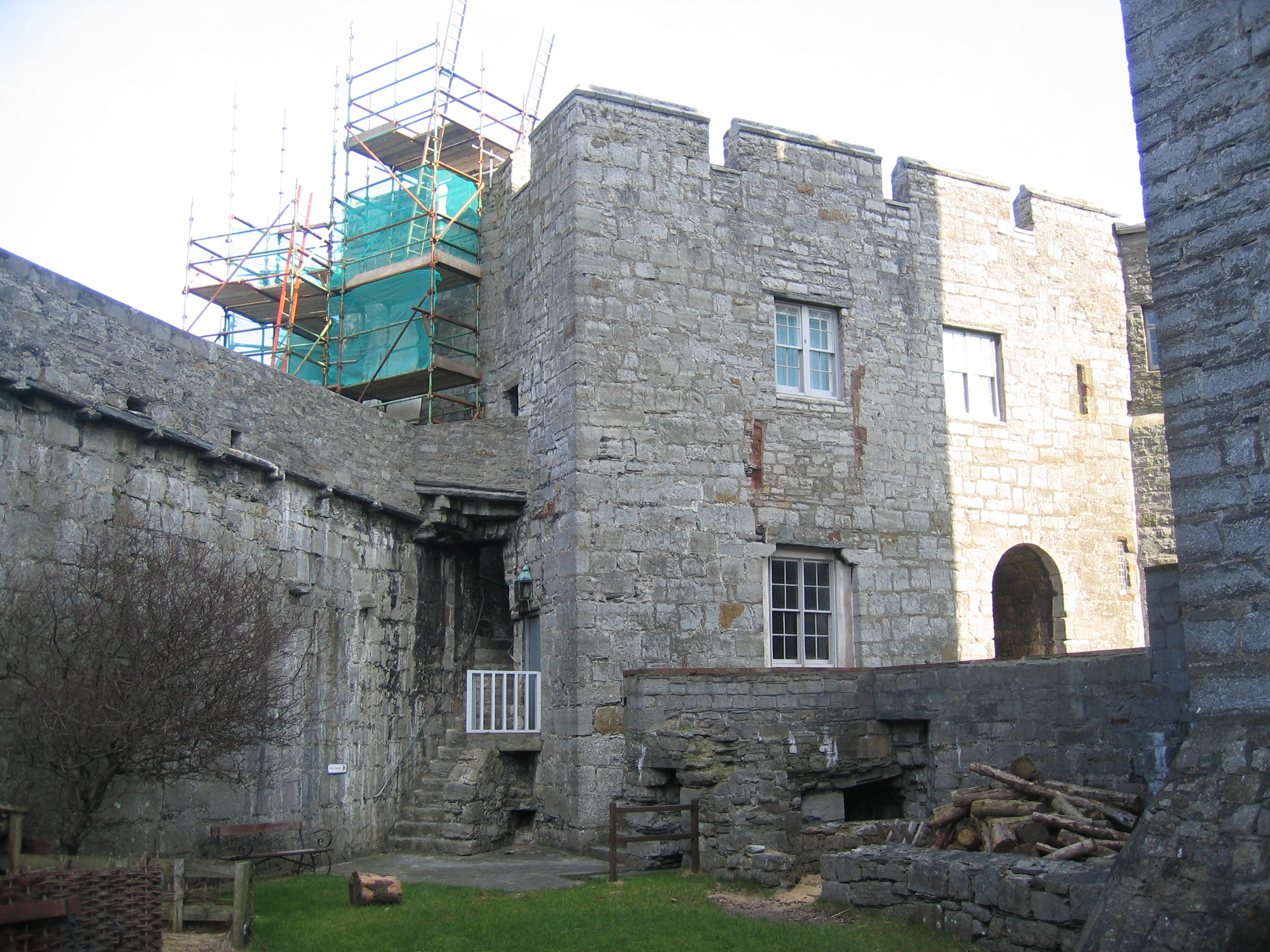
Castle Rushen's barbican seen from inside the curtain wall

== See also ==
- Kingdom of the Isles
- Rev. Joseph George Cumming – wrote about the castle and the Isle of Man.
