= Wife Swap (British TV series) =

- Genre: Reality
- Country of origin: United Kingdom
- Original language: English
- No. of series: 11
- No. of episodes: 66 (inc. 13 specials)

Production
- Running time: 60 minutes (inc. adverts)
- Production company: RDF Television

Original release
- Network: Channel 4
- Release: 7 January 2003 – 19 December 2009
- Release: 15 June 2017

Wife Swap is a British reality television programme that aired on Channel 4 from 7 January 2003 to 15 June 2017.

In the programme, two families, usually from different social classes and lifestyles, swap wives/mothers – and sometimes husbands – for two weeks. In fact, the programme will usually deliberately swap wives with dramatically different lifestyles, such as a messy wife swapping with a fastidiously neat one. Despite using a phrase from the swinging lifestyle, couples participating in the show do not share a bed with the "swapped" spouse while "swapping" homes.

In November 2009, Channel 4 announced that they had cancelled Wife Swap, and no new episodes of the show would be made for the channel. The final episode was broadcast in December 2009.

It was announced that Wife Swap would return for a special Brexit episode to air on 15 June 2017 on Channel 4.

== Synopsis ==
During the first week, the new wife must adhere to exactly the same rules and lifestyle of the wife she is replacing. Each wife leaves behind a house manual which explains her role in the family and the duties she holds. This almost always determines what rules the wives will apply at the "rules change ceremony".

During the second week, the new wives are allowed to establish their own rules, and their new families must adhere to these new household rules. It usually takes a while for the families to adjust to this policy, meanwhile the wives disburse a sum of money to the family they have become involved with, to do what the wives see fit to spend it on.

At the end of the two weeks, the two couples all meet together for the first time, and the wives, along with their husbands, discuss how they felt about the two weeks. This often descends into personal insults and has degenerated into violence at least twice. More often than not, however, both families reach toward a middle ground and express that they have learned from the experience. Sometimes, the table meeting is a very heartfelt and emotional time for the two families who sometimes have complete and mutual respect for each other. A few weeks later, the cameras return to record what changes have occurred since the wife swap.

== Transmissions ==
Wife Swap had 11 total seasons, as well as a celebrity version. This table is approximate as exact dates are not known for all seasons.

=== Series ===
Series	Start date	End date	Episodes
1	7 January 2003	28 January 2003	4
2	30 September 2003	4 November 2003	6
3	29 June 2004	27 July 2004	6
4	26 October 2004	9 February 2005	6
5	19 September 2005	24 October 2005	6
6	2006	2006	4
7	2006	2006	5
8	2007	2007	10
9	2008	2008	9
10	2008	2009	5
11	2009	19 December 2009	6

=== Specials ===
Date	Entitle
30 September 2003	Changed Our Marriage
29 June 2004	Changed Our Marriage
15 June 2017	Brexit Special

=== Celebrity Wife Swap ===
There were nine celebrity episodes, airing between 11 November 2003 and 16 August 2009.

== International versions ==
Country	Title	Network	First airdate
Australia	Wife Swap Australia	LifeStyle You; Seven Network	9 January 2012
Belarus	Обмен Жёнами; Obmen Zhjonamy	ONT	24 September 2011
Belgium	De Nieuwe Mama	vtm	2004
Brazil	Troca de Esposas	RecordTV	14 February 2019
Bulgaria	Смени жената Smeni zhenata	bTV	1 March 2017
Chile	¿Quién cambia a quién? Intercambio de Esposas	Canal 13	14 March 2006
Croatia	Mijenjam ženu	RTL	2006
Czech Republic	Výměna manželek	TV Nova	5 September 2005
Denmark	Par på prøve	TV3	6 October 2003
France	On a échangé nos mamans	M6	13 January 2004
Germany	Frauentausch	RTL II	14 July 2003
India	Maa Exchange	Sony	January 2011
Italy	Cambio moglie	Fox Life; LA7, SKY Vivo; NOVE	2004; 2005-2008; 20 May 2020
Israel	אמא מחליפה; Ima Mahlifah	Channel 2 (Keshet)	2005
Netherlands	Jouw vrouw, mijn vrouw	RTL4	?
New Zealand	Wife Swap NZ	TVNZ 2	30 May 2019
Norway	Konebytte	TV3	22 November 2004
Poland	Zamiana żon	TV4	7 June 2007
Poland	Zamiana żon	TTV	19 April 2018
Romania	Schimb de mame	Prima TV	2006
Russia	Обмен Жёнами; Obmen Zhjonamy	STS	9 July 2011
Russia	Обмен Жёнами; Obmen Zhjonamy	Yu TV	2017
Serbia	Мењам жену Menjam ženu	RTV Pink; Happy TV	July 2006
Slovakia	Zámena manželiek	TV Markiza	6 September 2004
Spain	Me cambio de familia	Cuatro	5 February 2010
Ukraine	Міняю жінку Minyayu zhinku	1+1	8 March 2010
United States	Wife Swap	ABC; CMT	26 September 2004

== Spin-offs ==
=== Boss Swap ===
A spin-off, Boss Swap, was broadcast as a series in the UK. A pilot for an American series was shown on ABC but was not commissioned. Husband Swap and Vacation Swap pilots were also broadcast in America, but were not picked up for series production. In the Netherlands and Belgium Vacation Swap episodes, are produced as "Jouw vakantie, mijn vakantie".

At least once a husband and a live-in boyfriend swapped while the women stayed with their families.

=== X-Change ===
There is an ongoing series on China's Hunan Television in which the people being swapped are mostly the eldest children (or in rare cases, youngest or all children) of between 9–16 years old. One of these comes from an affluent family, but with behavioural and legal issues, in which they must surrender all technological gadgets and money (except for the allowances left by the opposite family, or any money they earned or collected). The other is from a poorer agricultural village, often orphaned or with single parents. This show also has celebrity mentors making videos of support for the participants.

In the Netherlands the same format is being used in KRO's Puberruil, broadcast on NPO3. The children are 15–18 years old. Most of the time Dutch children are swapped, but there are also episodes named "Puberruil buitenland" where Dutch children are swapped with children in countries like India, Brazil and Sierra Leone. Longer episodes are called "Puberruil Xtra".

== In popular culture ==
- In 2007, Richard Thomas's BBC Two series Kombat Opera Presents included a musical parody of the American version of Wife Swap, under the title Spouse Change.
- In The Vicar of Dibley, Alice Tinker mentions going on the programme.
- In 2009 during a week of EastEnders, Max Branning and Tanya Branning swapped lifestyles with Ian Beale and Jane Beale for a week.
- The programme was parodied in the children's programme Horrible Histories, where it was called Historical Wife Swap. In the sketch, wives from different positions, such as a Viking and a thrall, or a Pharaoh and a peasant would swap, showing how these people lived. There were seven sketches in total, appearing in series 1–5.
