= Makin Review =

2024 report on child abuse by John Smyth

The Makin Review (also known as the John Smyth Review) is an independent review into the Church of England's handling of allegations of abuse committed by John Smyth QC, a barrister who had been involved in Christian children's ministry through the conservative evangelical Iwerne camps. After protracted delays, it was published in November 2024, and resulted in the resignation of the Archbishop of Canterbury, Justin Welby.

== Background ==
The Iwerne camps were a series of Christian holiday camps were run in the Dorset village of Iwerne Minster from the 1940s until 2020, which aimed to spread conservative evangelical Christian faith to boys from Britain's most prestigious boarding schools.

John Smyth had attended a camp whilst he was at university in the 1960s, and subsequently took a leading role in their organisation. He also gained access to a Christian group at Winchester College, near where he lived.

On 2 February 2017, Channel 4 News broadcast a report from Cathy Newman alleging Smyth had violently assaulted boys and young men in England and Africa. In England, Smyth had contacted the victims through his involvement in Winchester College and the camps, and, after a period of "grooming" that could last several years, subjected them to prolonged beatings with a cane in his garden shed, assisted by a former Winchester pupil, Simon Doggart. After Smyth moved to Africa in 1984, he continued to run holiday camps and abuse a large number of victims.

Smyth died of a suspected heart attack on 11 August 2018 at his home in Cape Town.

== Commissioning ==
Although the camps were not an official Church of England activity, many of the organisers and speakers were ordained Church of England clergymen. There were claims that these people had first discovered Smyth's abuse in 1982, covered it up, and facilitated Smyth's move to Africa.

In August 2019, the National Safeguarding Team of the Church of England announced that it had appointed Keith Makin, a former director of social services, to carry out a "lessons-learnt" review of the handling of allegations of abuse against Smyth. The review was planned to start in August 2019 and finish by May 2020. It actually commenced in November 2019, but completion was significantly delayed.

== Authors ==
The report was authored by Keith Makin and Sarah Lawrence, both of whom have experience in abuse inquiries and cases.

== Publication ==
In October 2024, the Church of England announced that the review would be published on 13 November 2024.

However, it was actually published on 7 November 2024. It amounted to 253 pages plus 245 pages of appendices. In an interview with Times Radio on 15 November 2024, Cathy Newman stated that the review had been leaked to Channel 4, which prompted the Church to publish it earlier than initially announced.

Publication was reported by many media outlets, including the BBC, Channel 4, The Times, and The Guardian.

== Conclusions ==
John Smyth was an appalling abuser of children and young men. His abuse was prolific, brutal and horrific. His victims were subjected to traumatic physical, sexual, psychological and spiritual attacks. The impact of that abuse is impossible to overstate and has permanently marked the lives of his victims. John Smyth's own family are victims of his abuse.

— Keith Makin, Independent Learning Lessons Review - John Smyth QC, Page 1, Paragraph 1.3

Smyth was described as "arguably, the most prolific serial abuser to be associated with the Church of England". He was found to have abused between 115 and 130 boys and young men, and was active from the mid-1970s until close to his death in 2018.

The review criticised the response to initial reports of Smyth's behaviour, finding that there was an "active cover-up" to conceal the abuse:

John Smyth's activities were identified in the 1980s... the steps taken by the Church of England and other organisations and individuals were ineffective and neither fully exposed nor prevented further abuse by him.

Church officers and others were made aware of the abuse in the form of a key report in 1982 prepared by the Reverend Mark Ruston. The recipients of that report participated in an active cover-up to prevent that report and its findings – including that crimes had been committed – coming to light. There is no excuse or good explanation that justifies that decision.

— Keith Makin, Independent Learning Lessons Review - John Smyth QC, Page 1, Paragraphs 1.4 & 1.5

The review found the abuse had been covered up by a "powerful evangelical clergy", after becoming an open secret within the "Conservative Evangelical network" after the 1982 Ruston Report, and that senior figures within the Church of England were aware of the abuse.

Psychological analysis by Dr Elly Hanson concluded that "the beliefs and values of the conservative evangelical community in which John Smyth operated are critical to understanding how he manipulated his victims into it, how it went on for so long, and how he evaded justice." This included "intrusive and intense one-to-one mentoring of boys and young men" and "a focus on personal sinfulness, producing a default sense of guilt, defectiveness, submission and indebtedness to God".

== Aftermath ==
On 7 November 2024, following publication of the review, a number of Smyth's victims released a public statement through Andrew Graystone.

On the same day, Cathy Newman interviewed Justin Welby on Channel 4 News. Welby apologised for the church's failings and indicated that he had considered resigning, but would not be doing so.

On 9 November 2024, a petition was launched on Change.org calling for Welby's resignation. The petition was started by three members of the house of clergy in General Synod: Rev Robert Thompson, Rev Ian Paul, and Rev Marcus Walker. They noted that the Makin Review had concluded that Welby bore responsibility for the failures of the Church of England relating to Smyth. The petition received widespread coverage, including by the BBC, Channel 4, and The Guardian.

On 11 November 2024, Helen-Ann Hartley, the Bishop of Newcastle, also called for the resignation of Justin Welby. She felt that the Church's response to the Makin Review had been disappointing, that its leadership was failing, and that the Archbishop's position was untenable.

Welby announced his resignation on 12 November 2024. His resignation letter referenced the Makin Review and accepted that he needed to take "personal and institutional responsibility" for the failures identified by the review. Rev Ian Paul, writing in Evangelicals Now, noted that the resignation was unprecedented, as no previous Archbishop of Canterbury has ever resigned.

On 20 November 2024, Keith Makin gave his first interview since the publication of his review. Makin said he was pleased with the review's impact and indicated that he had heard from a number of Smyth's victims, who felt that Welby's resignation was the right outcome.

== Related reviews and publications ==
Scripture Union commissioned an independent case review into its role in the camps. It published the executive summary in March 2021.

The Titus Trust, the successor to the Iwerne Trust which had financed and effectively run the camps at which Smyth contacted many victims, released a document in August 2021 detailing its role and actions.

Andrew Graystone, a theologian and journalist, wrote a book, Bleeding For Jesus: John Smyth and the cult of the Iwerne Camps, which was published in August 2021.

Winchester College commissioned an independent review into the abuse committed by John Smyth, which was published in January 2022.
