= Titus Trust =

Registered Charity

- Founded: 1997
- Type: Charitable trust
- Registration no.: 1066751
- Location: Registered Office: 12 Lime Tree Mews, 2 Lime Walk, Oxford. OX3 7DZ
- Region served: England & Wales
- Method: “To seek by every available effective means to make the Christian faith a living practical issue to young people having a past or present association with independent schools in England and Wales, this being done in accordance with the basis of faith.”
- Key people: The Revd and Hon David Fletcher; Mr Giles Rawlinson (Chair until 2016) Peter Gaskell
- Subsidiaries: Iwerne Holidays, Christian Activity Holidays Forres, Lymington Rushmore Holidays, Gloddaeth Holidays, LDN Holidays
- Revenue: £2million (2017)
- Employees: 18
- Volunteers: 939
- Website: www.titustrust.org
- Formerly called: Iwerne Trust

The Titus Trust is a registered charity in the UK, and is the successor organisation to the Iwerne Trust.

It runs evangelical Christian holiday camps for children and young people at private schools. The camps provide adventure activities including kayaking, climbing, go-karting, sailing, laser clay-pigeon shooting and other activities, while also providing Bible studies and discussion groups on the Christian faith.

The Iwerne Trust was set up in 1932 by E. J. H. Nash ("Bash"), initially to financially support the Iwerne camps, which were in theory run by Scripture Union (though in practice largely independent). In 1997 it was succeeded by the Titus Trust, which took over running of the holidays directly in 2000.

In 2017, details came to light about abuse of boys at Iwerne Trust camps by barrister and Iwerne Trust chairman John Smyth which eventually resulted in a settlement being reached between the Titus Trust and a group of survivors. Smyth died in 2018.

In February 2025, a Channel 4 investigation reported allegations of sexual assault and harassment of girls and women by David Fletcher, leader of Iwerne and Titus Trust trustee.

== History ==
=== Iwerne Trust ===
The Iwerne holidays were started in 1932 at Clayesmore School in the village of Iwerne Minster by E. J. H. Nash (popularly known as "Bash"), a member of staff of Scripture Union.

These camps were initially for boys at the top thirty British public schools, and aimed to promote evangelicalism in the Church of England and in senior leadership positions in the British establishment. Many men who became influential church leaders attended the Iwerne camps, including John Stott, David Sheppard, Michael Green, Dick Lucas and Justin Welby.

Randle Manwaring wrote

The keynotes of Iwerne were always very simple bible teaching and pastoral care through strongly developed friendships at all levels. Attendance was by invitation only and limited to boys at major public schools, at least boarding schools. The unofficial, sotto voce, slogan of the ‘Bash Camps’ (Bash being the very affectionate name given to E. J. H. Nash) was ‘key boys from key schools’ and, whilst this strategy of creating a patrician, elitist Christian society was criticised by many, the results were most remarkable.

Manwaring's book was criticised as offering "more partisan pieties than it does historical analysis".

Nash retired from the staff of Scripture Union in 1965, and David Fletcher (son of Labour politician Eric Fletcher) took over responsibility for the camps.

The holidays were, in theory, run under the auspices of Scripture Union, with the Iwerne Trust raising funds to support them. However, by time of David Fletcher's leadership, the holidays were in practice run by the Iwerne Trust, with no meaningful oversight from Scripture Union, although its senior leaders remained legally employed by Scripture Union (but paid with money provided by the Iwerne Trust).

Nicky Gumbel, founder of the Alpha course, was involved in the camps during Fletcher's years, and Fletcher described Alpha as: "basically the Iwerne camp talk scheme with charismatic stuff added on", though Gumbel himself admits only an indirect link.

John Smyth, a barrister who was best known for acting for Mary Whitehouse in her successful private prosecution for blasphemy against the newspaper Gay News, became chair of the Iwerne Trust in 1974 and was involved with the camps until 1981.

=== Titus Trust ===
The Titus Trust was set up in 1997 to replace the Iwerne Trust, with the aim of clarifying the previously-confused relationship between Scripture Union and the trust. In 2000 it took full control of the running of the holidays, with Scripture Union ceasing to be involved.

In 2020, after the John Smyth abuse case, the trust announced that it would be closing down the Iwerne brand and directing attendees towards its other camps (Lymington Rushmore, Gloddaeth and LDN).

=== John Smyth abuse scandal ===
John Smyth QC, a former Chairman of Iwerne Trust, had been wanted for questioning by the police at the time of his death in August 2018. There were multiple claims from former boys at Winchester College during the 1970s and 1980s of savage psycho-sexual beatings. Smyth had previously worked as a barrister representing Mary Whitehouse, who campaigned against cultural liberalism. Reports of his alleged physical abuse of at least 22 boys were revealed in an investigation by Channel 4 News in February 2017.

Iwerne Trust had carried out its own internal report in 1982, compiled by Mark Ruston of the Round Church Cambridge and David Fletcher of the Scripture Union, but it was not made public until 2016. It found Smyth targeted pupils from leading public schools and took them to his home near Winchester in Hampshire, where he carried out lashings with a garden cane in his shed. It said eight of the boys received a total of 14,000 lashes, while two more received 8,000 strokes between them over three years. Iwerne Trust called the practice "horrific" but did not report the claims to police for over 30 years, until 2013.

Smyth fled the United Kingdom in 1984 and moved to Zimbabwe where, in 1986, he set up summer camps for boys from the country's leading schools. He was arrested in 1997 during an investigation into the drowning of Guide Nyachuru, a 16-year-old adolescent, at the Marondera camp. He then moved to Cape Town, South Africa, where he ran the Justice Alliance of South Africa for some years. The Alliance describes itself as "a coalition of corporations‚ individuals and churches committed to upholding and fighting for justice and the highest moral standards in South African society." It transpired that he had practised the same vicious beatings on many more young boys in these countries.

Following his death, the Titus Trust released a statement which said:

It is deeply regrettable that John Smyth's death has robbed his victims of the opportunity to see justice done. Since 2014, when the board of the Titus Trust was informed of the allegations, we have done all we can to ensure the matter is properly investigated by the relevant authorities. We sympathise deeply with Smyth's victims and continue to pray that they find healing and freedom from the harm that was so unjustly inflicted on them. Our thoughts and prayers are with all those affected by the news of John Smyth's death.

A group of survivors describing themselves as 'amongst the scores of victims' beaten by Smyth released their own statement which outlined that they were 'appalled' by the response of Titus Trust. They denied the Trust had done all it could to ensure Smyth was properly investigated, and also its claim that the Trust was only notified of the allegations against him in 2014. They stated that one of its trustees, David Fletcher, had commissioned a report into Smyth in 1982 but not passed any information to the police. Fletcher also had a further report of Smyth's abuse in Zimbabwe in 1993. They also said that reports were stored in the loft of the chair of the Trust, Giles Rawlinson, and were not made available to any secular authorities until 2017, when they were requisitioned by Hampshire police under warrant. The survivors went on to say that the Trust had refused to engage with victims, show any concern for their well-being, or offer support. Their statement said:

Their protestation of sympathy is cynical and disingenuous. Had the Titus Trust acted on the information that was available to it since its foundation, Smyth's abuse could have been stopped long ago. Our hearts go out to the 60 or more children of Zimbabwe and South Africa who suffered at the hands of John Smyth as we did, but needlessly. We have no interest in the "thoughts and prayers" of the Titus Trust. We do not believe they are fit to work with children.

In 2018 there were calls for an independent inquiry into both the abuse, and the culture of the Trust that enabled John Smyth to evade justice despite awareness amongst so many trustees, associated clergy and senior figures within the Church of England. In August 2018, it was reported that a group of survivors had launched a legal claim against the Titus Trust, who were running the Iwerne Trust camps. The group of men who launched this action said that the Trust had remained silent since the allegations about Smyth emerged. They engaged Richard Scorer to act for them. Andrew Graystone, acting as their advocate, said

“I have personally written to every individual Titus Trustee more than once, pleading for them to do their duty as trustees and as Christians, and help the victims. Not one has responded. The refusal of the trustees to offer any help to Smyth’s victims has massively compounded their suffering.

In March 2020 the Titus Trust reached a settlement with three men "who have suffered for many years because of the appalling abuse of John Smyth". The Trust expressed “profound regret” for the abuse, and apologised for “additional distress” caused by the way it responded to the allegations. A group of Smyth’s victims called in response for the trust to disband, as it had protected its own interests rather than offering care and support to victims.
