= Clayesmore School =

School in Dorset, England

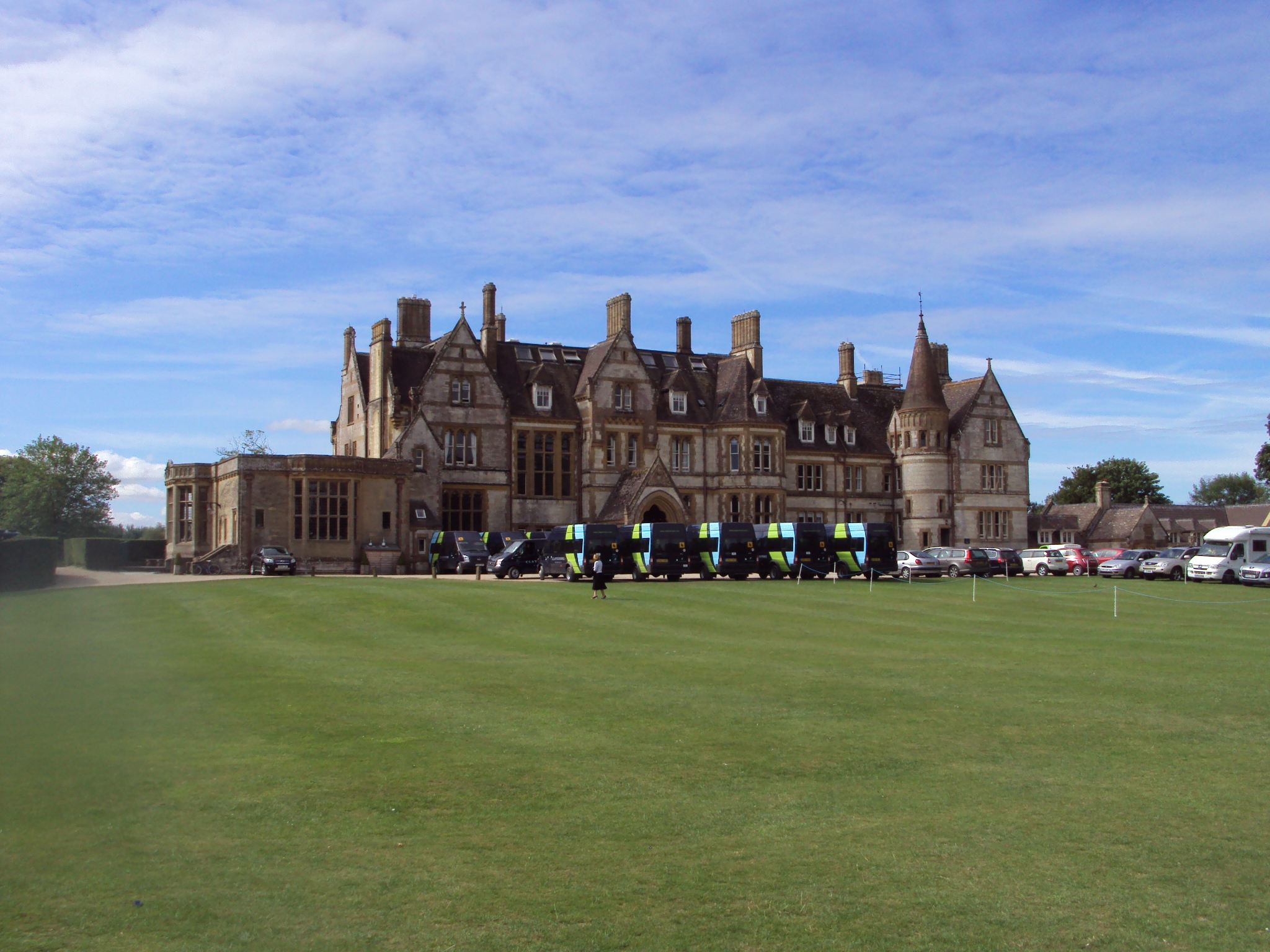

Location
- Iwerne Minster; Blandford Forum, Dorset, DT11 8LL; England; 50.93142°N 2.19644°W

Information
- Type: Private school Boarding school Day School
- Motto: Dieu premier donc mes frères (God first then my brothers)
- Religious affiliation: Church of England
- Established: 1896
- Founder: Alexander Devine
- Local authority: Dorset
- Department for Education URN: 113912 Tables
- Head: Rob Lane
- Gender: Coeducational
- Age: Nursery to Sixth Form
- Enrolment: 430
- Houses: Gate; Manor; King's; Wolverton
- Website: clayesmore.com

Clayesmore School is a co-educational private school for pupils aged 8–18 years, in the village of Iwerne Minster, Dorset, England. It is both a day and boarding school and is a member of The Headmasters' and Headmistresses' Conference (HMC).

The school was founded by Alexander Devine in 1896 in Enfield, Middlesex. After moving to Pangbourne, Berkshire and then to Winchester, Hampshire it finally moved to Iwerne Minster for the summer term of 1933. In 1974 it was joined on the Iwerne site by Clayesmore Preparatory School, originally Charlton Marshall School, which had been founded in 1929 by R.A.L. Everett. In the following year the school became co-educational.

As of 2023 there are 400 pupils in the senior school (ages 13–18) and 150 in the prep school (ages 3–13). The current head is Rob Lane. The school is situated on a 62-acre (250,000 m^{2}) campus.

== History ==
For centuries the land on which Clayesmore now stands was held by Shaftesbury Abbey. After the dissolution it passed to the Bowyer Bower family. Their family home was built in 1796 roughly on the site of the existing main building. In 1876 the last member of the Bowyer Bower family, Captain T Bowyer Bower, sold the village and estate to George Glyn, 2nd Baron Wolverton. The Baron demolished the house, laid out the Iwerne estate afresh and commissioned Alfred Waterhouse to design the present building (now Wolverton House) which was completed in 1878.

In 1904 the 4th Baron Wolverton put the whole 2,612-acre (10.57 km^{2}) estate up for sale. This was bought in 1908 by James Ismay whose father, Thomas Henry Ismay, had founded the White Star Line shipping company. On Ismay's death in January 1930 the estate was put up for sale in a number of separate lots. Clayesmore School bought the main manor house and the 60 acres (240,000 m^{2}) in which it stands, and the school moved in during 1933.

For over 60 years, starting in 1940, the school's buildings were used during school holidays as the location for the Evangelical Christian Iwerne camps.

In 1974, Clayesmore merged with Charlton Marshall School, which later became Clayesmore Prep School. The school became co-educational in 1975.

Clayesmore School officially joined the Inspired Learning Group on September 1, 2025. This is a significant change in the school's 130-year history.

== Iwerne camps ==
From the 1940s until the early 2000s, the school premises were hired during holidays by the Iwerne Trust for their evangelical Christian camps called the Iwerne camps, established by Scripture Union staff member E. J. H. "Bash" Nash. These holidays, aimed at boys from the top thirty British public schools, were highly influential on British evangelicalism, with attendees including theologian John Stott, bishops David Sheppard, Maurice Wood and Timothy Dudley-Smith, Archbishop Justin Welby and Alpha course founder Nicky Gumbel.

While the school served as the venue, the camps were independently organized. The camps later became the subject of media scrutiny due to the abuse carried out by camp leader John Smyth; independent reviews identified that while Smyth recruited victims at the camps, the physical abuse primarily occurred at his private residence in Winchester.

== Sports ==
Clayesmore has a purpose built sports centre on its grounds, including a swimming pool, as well as many other sports facilities. These include a full size astro pitch for hockey, tennis courts and cricket pitches (during the summer months), several rugby pitches, and athletics facilities.

== Heads ==
Former heads include:

- Alexander Devine, 1896–1930
- Aubrey de Sélincourt, 1931–1935
- Evelyn Mansfield King, 1935–1945

== Notable alumni ==
Former pupils (Old Clayesmorians or OCs) include:

- Anthony Allen, England rugby union player
- Edward Ardizzone, artist, writer and illustrator
- Martin Bott, geologist
- John Brooke-Little, officer of arms and heraldry expert
- Sir Marcus Cheke, diplomat
- John Craxton, painter
- Robyn Denny, artist
- George Devine, theatre manager
- Glynn Edwards, actor
- Brian Epstein, manager of The Beatles
- Nicole Faraday, actress
- Eric Fernihough, former holder of the motorcycle world speed record
- Nicholas C. Handy, theoretical chemist
- Tony Hart, artist and creator of Morph
- Graham Hayes, commando
- Stephen Joseph, pioneer of Theatre in the Round
- Lewis McManus, Hampshire and Northamptonshire cricketer
- Sir Howard Panter, theatre impresario
- John Plamenatz, political philosopher
- Julian Rathbone, novelist
- Jeremy Rogers, designer and builder of racing yachts such as Contessa 26 and Contessa 32
- Mike Scott, television presenter
- Hugh Stewart, film editor
- Sir Rodney Sweetnam, President of the Royal College of Surgeons 1995–98
- David Walser, Archdeacon of Ely

== Notable former masters ==
- Geoff Keating (1937–2026), founder member of The Master Singers

== In popular culture ==
The main house was used as a filming location for the Only Fools and Horses episode, A Touch of Glass (1982).
