= E. J. H. Nash =

English cleric (1898–1982)

The Reverend E. J. H. Nash
- Born: 22 April 1898
- Died: 4 April 1982 (aged 83)
- Education: Maidenhead College
- Alma mater: Trinity College, Cambridge; Ridley Hall, Cambridge
- Religion: Christianity (Anglican)
- Church: Church of England
- Ordained: 1927 (deacon)
- Congregations served: Scripture Union (1932–1965)

Eric John Hewitson "Bash" Nash (22 April 1898 – 4 April 1982) was a conservative evangelical Church of England cleric. His work of Christian evangelism and camp ministry in the top thirty public schools of the United Kingdom from 1932 onwards influenced post-war British evangelical resurgence. Over 7,000 boys attended the Iwerne camps under his leadership.

== Early years ==
Eric John Hewitson Nash was born on 22 April 1898. He was the second son of Anglican cleric Charles Hewitson Nash and his wife Frances. He was educated at Maidenhead College, an independent day school for boys; his career there was undistinguished. After leaving school, he began to work at an insurance company.

== Ministry ==
It was in 1917 (aged 19), on his way home to Maidenhead by train, that Nash "finally faced and responded to the claims of Christ upon his life." Steer says that he "had a vision in a railway carriage that he was to win Britain for Christ." Yet it was not until a few years later, whilst having tea in D H Evans in Oxford Street that he fully acknowledged Christ as Master and Lord and, "handed over to him the keys of every room in the house of his life."

In 1922, encouraged by the then Bishop of London, Arthur Winnington-Ingram, and supported by grants made available to him, Nash went to Trinity College, Cambridge and then Ridley Hall. He was made deacon in 1927 and served two curacies: one at St John's Church, Ealing and another at Emmanuel Church, Wimbledon. His first application to work with Scripture Union was rejected in 1929 so he spent a period as a chaplain at Wrekin College. In 1932, aged 33, after his second application, he was accepted and began to work for Scripture Union. He never married.

Nash made it his business to preach the Christian Gospel at the top thirty British public schools, and began a camp ministry which by 1940 was based at Clayesmore School in the village of Iwerne Minster. Attendance was by invitation only. He used military terminology: Nash was known as commandant, his deputy, adjutant and the leaders were officers. His prayer was "Lord, we claim the leading public schools for your kingdom." Unobtrusive, yet highly strategic, the enterprise involved simple Bible teaching accompanied by personal friendship and pastoral care. Additional camps began at Lymington in Hampshire for the second tier of public schools, and at Rushmore in Dorset for girls. He used a simple "A, B, C" formula to explain what needed to be done for conversion: "Admit your need of Christ; Believe that Christ died for you; Come to Him." The talks, morning and evening, "were a wonderfully clear, biblically faithful and winsome presentation of the Christian gospel of salvation."

Although Nash was an Anglican visiting Church of England institutions, his message was not necessarily welcome. Many parents would not have been open to their children embracing Evangelical religion. John Stott describes the meetings at Rugby as "strictly off the record and conducted with a good deal of secrecy". Nash lent his favourite books out, (often by R. A. Torrey) covered in brown paper to disguise them. His approach was shaped by methods common to Evangelical circles in North America, including an expectation of definite decisions for Christ, inquiries into people's spiritual state, a "lack of interest in social issues" and "a large dose of self-denying otherworldliness." This heritage, and the link to the United States was awkward. Nash emphasised the need for a personal encounter with Jesus, and this "upset one of the ruling assumptions of places like Rugby - that Christianity was the cultural birthright of any Englishman baptised and confirmed in the Church of England."

Nash wrote many letters. John Stott reports: "His letters to me often contained a rebuke, for I was a wayward young Christian and needed to be disciplined. In fact, so frequent were his admonitions at one period, that whenever I saw his familiar writing on an envelope, I needed to pray and prepare myself for half an hour before I felt ready to open it." Nash focused on those individuals that he felt had special leadership qualities, "not from snobbery, but from strategy." According to Bishop David Sheppard, Nash would pray "Lord, we know that thou dost love one talent and two talent men, but we pray that thou wouldst give us a five talent man."

Nash's influence also stretched to University Christian Unions in the Inter-Varsity Fellowship. Between 1935 and 1939 "all CICCU's presidents were "Bash" campers, and the union was marked by his methods: a very simple evangelical gospel; meticulous preparation; a wariness of emotions or intellect and assiduous “personal work” before and after conversion."

Despite his forthrightness, Nash was always courteous. He was shrewd, and secured the support of Head Teachers by recruiting the Christian staff of their schools to his camp. With discernment he enlisted men with greater gifts than his own. He adopted customs of dress and manners considered acceptable in the context of his work. He was well known for his sense of humour, and his ability to create a happy atmosphere. Chapman notes: "He was an unassuming yet eccentric figure who avoided tomato pips, took a bewildering array of medications, and enjoyed juvenile humour." He had a special gift for making the gospel both "understandable and attractive." Nicky Gumbel said: "He was extremely gracious and I sensed a deep humility."

== Theology ==
Nash considered R. A. Torrey to be his theological mentor, and valued the Keswick Convention, encouraging his leaders to attend. In line with Keswick thought, Nash spoke of "being dead to sin" (Romans 6:7) using the analogy of a dead dog in the gutter: "A touch of the foot would show if it was only sleeping: it would instantly respond where a dead dog would not." One of Nash's favourite books was Torrey's Why God Used D. L. Moody.

He was "at heart, a pacifist." He held very strong views about Sunday, avoiding games, newspapers and travelling. He did not drink alcohol, or go to the theatre. He was a man of prayer, believing it to be the opportunity to develop his relationship with God. Whilst having a high view of Scripture, he was not a great Bible student. He connected the deity of Christ thoroughly to the Lordship of Christ. Nash believed in the centrality of the cross and would say: "the only way to Mansion House is via King's Cross."

Despite the involvement of some of his protégés (David Watson, Michael Green, John Collins, David Macinnes and later Nicky Gumbel), he did not welcome the Charismatic Renewal of the early 60s and 70s. On hearing one leader expressing himself in a way characteristic of the renewal, he said "will officers please not pray such emotional prayers," something David Watson records as a disappointment: "although slight in itself, [it] seemed to oppose all the new found joy and freedom in worship that had become so important to me."

== Assessment ==
"Bash... was a quiet, unassuming clergyman who never sought the limelight, hit the headlines or wanted preferment; and yet whose influence within the Church of England... was probably greater than any of his contemporaries... Those who knew him well, and those who worked with him, never expect to see his like again; for rarely can anyone have meant so much to so many as this quietly spoken, modest and deeply spiritual man." - John Eddison

Nash's approach was reminiscent of J. C. Ryle's "reach the few to reach the many" strategy used to counteract the rise of Anglo-Catholicism within the academy. David Fletcher remembers "Bash was told that his work would never succeed because it is hard for the rich to enter the Kingdom of Heaven, but Jesus went on to say that with God all things are possible."

John King said: "Many 'Bash campers' went from school to Cambridge and became pillars of the Cambridge Inter-Collegiate Christian Union, so that it was possible, when the movement was at its zenith for a boy to go from public school to Cambridge, to ordination, to a curacy and to a parish of his own without encountering the kind of life lived outside those particular circles..." Some have noted that Nash created an "oddly male, oddly elitist, and oddly simplistic world." In 1969, it could be said that much of the leadership of the British Evangelical church had been "Bash campers". King goes on to say that in order to understand the Evangelical mind, therefore, it was necessary to understand the "Bash camp" mind:

Controversy is eschewed by "Bash campers"; it is held to be noisy and undignified - and potentially damaging. As a result many issues which ought to be faced are quietly avoided. Any practical decisions that must be made are taken discreetly by the leadership and passed down the line. The loyalty of the rank and file is such that decisions are respected; any who question are liable to find themselves outside the pale... It does not give a place to the process of argument, consultation and independent thought which are essential to any genuine co-operation, inside the church or outside it.

Bishop David Sheppard remarked that Nash could be "single-minded to the point of ruthlessness" and "courageous in challenging people about their actions or priorities," but that this could become "over-direction"; some even needed to make a complete break in order to be free of his influence.

Even if some cast doubt on his "rigid focus" and his hope for a national "trickle-down effect" in 2005 John Stott, his most famous protégé, was ranked among the 100 most influential people in the world by Time magazine. Alister McGrath describes Nash and his ministry as one of the factors leading to the post-war Evangelical renaissance, saying his work "laid the nucleus for a new generation of Evangelical thinkers and leaders."

== Last years ==
Nash remained on the staff of Scripture Union until 1965. David Fletcher (son of Labour politician Eric Fletcher) became responsible for the camps, descendants of which continue today under the auspices of the Titus Trust. Nash continued to have a fruitful ministry until he was eighty; after this, his health began to fail. He died peacefully in his own home on 4 April 1982, just a few weeks before his 84th birthday. His executors were unable to trace a single living member of his family yet, according to John Eddison, the crowd at his memorial service was full of those who regarded themselves as his spiritual children. John Stott led his memorial service at All Souls, Langham Place in June 1982. His gravestone reads "Remembered with love and gratitude by the many whom he led to Christ and nurtured in the Christian faith."

== Associated with his work ==
Here, then, is the crucial question which we have been leading up to. Have we ever opened our door to Christ? Have we ever invited him in? This was exactly the question which I needed to have put to me. [...] I am profoundly grateful to him for enabling me to open the door. Looking back now over more than fifty years, I realise that that simple step has changed the entire direction, course and quality of my life. - John Stott

Through him many influential people became converted to Christianity, including such clergy as John Stott, David Sheppard, Michael Green John Pollock, Dick Lucas, Bishop Maurice Wood, Bishop Timothy Dudley-Smith, Mark Ruston, John Collins, Hugh Palmer, Mark Ashton, Paul Perkins, John Coles, William Taylor, Henry Chadwick, Richard Bewes and David Macinnes. David Watson was invited by David Sheppard and attended thirty-five camps in five years. Sir Fred Catherwood also participated as did John Smyth the barrister and abuser. Among Nash's other spiritual progeny were several principals of theological colleges, and over 200 clergy. In education there were several head teachers and over 150 teaching staff. In sport, John Dewes and David Sheppard both played cricket for England. In the military, there was Brigadier Ian Dobbie. Justin Welby, the current Archbishop of Canterbury, was also a participant.

== Alpha course ==
The Alpha course founder Nicky Gumbel also participated. David Fletcher, who took responsibility for the camps after Nash, described Alpha as: "basically the Iwerne camp talk scheme with charismatic stuff added on." Rob Warner says: "Alpha can therefore be summed up as Bash camp rationalistic conservatism combined with Wimberist charismatic expressivism... this is a highly unusual, even paradoxical hybrid." Gumbel himself will only admit an indirect link. Andrew Atherstone says "parts of Gumbel's Alpha course had their roots in the basic gospel foundations provided by Iwerne."

== Bibliography ==
- How to Succeed in the Christian Life (1940) ISBN 0-87784-109-8
- Life at its Best
