= The Romans in Britain =

1980 stage play

- Poster designed by Richard Bird advertising the original 1980 National Theatre production.
- Original language: English
- Written by: Howard Brenton
- Setting: North of the River Thames (54 BC); Britain (AD 515); Ireland (AD 1980)

Premiere
- Date: 16 October 1980
- Place: National Theatre, London

The Romans in Britain is a 1980 stage play by Howard Brenton that comments upon imperialism and the abuse of power. It was the subject of an unsuccessful private prosecution for gross indecency brought by the conservative moral campaigner Mary Whitehouse.

== Stage history ==
The play was first staged at the National Theatre in London on 16 October 1980. The director was Michael Bogdanov. A cast of 30 actors played 60 roles. The play "drew a direct parallel between the Roman invasion of Celtic Britain in 54 BC and the contemporary British presence in Northern Ireland". The first act contains "a brief scene" of (simulated) anal rape of a druid (played by Greg Hicks) by a Roman centurion (Peter Sproule). The police visited the production three times and found no basis for legal action.

The first amateur production by students at Swansea University in 1983 was cancelled after a threat of prosecution.

Actor-director Samuel West revived the play in 2006 at the Crucible Theatre, Sheffield. The production starred Tom Mannion as Julius Caesar and Dan Stevens as Marban the Druid.

== Whitehouse's prosecution ==
The 1980 production became the focus of a private prosecution in 1982 by Christian morality campaigner Mary Whitehouse against the play's director Michael Bogdanov relating to the on-stage depiction of male-on-male rape.

In the trial, beginning 15 March 1982, Whitehouse's counsel claimed section 13 of the Sexual Offences Act 1956, which described the offence of "procuring an act of gross indecency", was applicable. Because this was a general act, there was no defence on the basis of artistic merit which was possible under the Obscene Publications Act 1959.

The prosecution rested on the testimony of Whitehouse's solicitor, Graham Ross-Cornes, who claimed he saw the actor's penis. However, cross-examination revealed that he had seen a performance of the play from the back row of the stalls, 90 feet from the stage. Jeremy Hutchinson QC, counsel for Bogdanov, was able to demonstrate the nature of the illusion performed on stage. This was achieved by demonstrating that it might have been the actor's thumb protruding from his fist, rather than his penis. The defence had argued that the Sexual Offences Act 1956 did not apply to the theatre; the judge Mr Justice Staughton then ruled that it did. After three days, the action was withdrawn after the prosecution counsel told Whitehouse that he was unable to continue with the case; the litigation was ended by the Attorney General putting forward a plea of nolle prosequi. Both sides claimed a victory; Whitehouse's side asserted that the important legal point had been made with the ruling on the applicability of the Sexual Offences Act 1956, while Bogdanov said it was because she knew that he would not be convicted. Whitehouse had to meet £20,000 costs, most of which was paid by an anonymous donor.

In A Most Dangerous Woman? (1982) Whitehouse wrote that she was of the opinion that the legal point that the Sexual Offences Act could be applied to events on stage had been established and they had no wish to criminalise Bogdanov.

Barrister John Smyth initially acted for Whitehouse in her prosecution but withdrew from the case in March 1982. This was stated at the time to be due to a “viral infection” but was later documented in the Makin Review to have been part of his agreement with the Iwerne Trust after they became aware of his child abuse. Smyth had appeared for her in Whitehouse v Lemon (1977), the prosecution for blasphemy of Gay News.

== See also ==
- English drama
- Theatre of the United Kingdom

== Bibliography ==
- Howard Brenton, The Romans in Britain (London: Eyre Methuen, 1980) ISBN 0-413-46590-X
