= Romans in Britain =

Romans in Britain may refer to:

- Roman conquest of Britain
- Roman Britain, the Roman Empire's governorship of part of Great Britain
- The Romans in Britain, a controversial 1980 stage play
