= John Smyth (barrister) =

British barrister and child abuser (1941–2018)

John Smyth QC
- Smyth in 2017
- Born: John Jackson Smyth; 27 June 1941; Calgary, Alberta, Canada
- Died: 11 August 2018 (aged 77); Bergvliet, South Africa
- Citizenship: United Kingdom
- Education: Trinity Hall, Cambridge (MA, LLB)
- Occupation: Barrister
- Known for: Child abuse
- Spouse: Josephine Anne Leggott (m. 1968)
- Children: 4

John Jackson Smyth QC (/smaɪð/; 27 June 1941 – 11 August 2018) was a British barrister, judge (recorder), and serial child abuser who was involved in Christian ministry for children as chairman of the Iwerne Trust which raised funds for, and in practice ran, the influential conservative evangelical Iwerne camps. He was the lawyer for the Christian morality campaigner Mary Whitehouse.

In 1982, the Iwerne Trust was informed that Smyth had performed sadistic beatings on schoolboys and young men associated with the Iwerne Camps and with a Christian group at Winchester College. Smyth moved to Zimbabwe in 1984, where he continued to run children's camps. The police were not informed of the 1982 report until 2013, and it became public in 2017. Church of England bishop Andrew Watson disclosed that, as a young man, he was a victim. Smyth's son in an interview reported that Smyth sadistically caned him as a child. Smyth died of heart failure while under investigation and was never charged.

An independent review published in 2024 concluded that he subjected more than 100 boys and young men to "traumatic physical, sexual, psychological and spiritual attacks" over a period of four decades. The review found that his abuse was an open secret, which was covered up by "powerful evangelical clergy", and that the beliefs and values of conservative evangelicalism were critical to his evasion of justice, and to how he manipulated his victims. On 12 November 2024, the Archbishop of Canterbury, Justin Welby, announced he would resign due to the part he played in the church's failure to acknowledge Smyth's child abuse.

== Early life ==
John Jackson Smyth was born in Calgary, Alberta, Canada, on 27 June 1941. He attended Strathcona School.

He and his family subsequently moved to the Isle of Wight in England, and he was educated at St Lawrence College in Kent. In 1960, he went up to Trinity Hall, Cambridge, to study natural sciences, but switched to law in his second year. He received his BA (later MA) in 1963 and his LLB in 1964.

== Legal career ==
Smyth was called to the Bar at Inner Temple in 1965 and took silk as a Queen's Counsel in 1979. He was a recorder (with the powers of a circuit judge able to sit in the Crown Court, the County Court or the Family Court) from 1978 to 1984. During the 1970s and early 1980s, he lived in Winchester while practising law in London.

In July 1977, Smyth acted for Christian morality campaigner Mary Whitehouse in her successful private prosecution for blasphemy (Whitehouse v Lemon) at the Old Bailey against the newspaper Gay News and its editor, Denis Lemon, over the publication of James Kirkup's poem The Love that Dares to Speak its Name. He also initially acted for Whitehouse in her failed private prosecution of the National Theatre production of Howard Brenton's play The Romans in Britain in 1980, but withdrew from the case in 1982, which was stated at the time to be due to illness, but was later documented in the Makin Review to have been part of his agreement with the Iwerne Trust after they became aware of his abuse.

Smyth moved to Zimbabwe in 1984 and to South Africa in 2001. While living in Cape Town, South Africa, he ran the Justice Alliance of South Africa (JASA) for some years. JASA describes itself as "a coalition of corporations‚ individuals and churches committed to upholding and fighting for justice and the highest moral standards in South African society".

Smyth represented South Africa's Doctors for Life, and, as an amicus curiae of the Constitutional Court in May 2005, unsuccessfully opposed the legalisation of same-sex marriage in South Africa in Minister of Home Affairs v Fourie. Smyth claimed that to introduce same-sex marriage would result in "violence to the mind and spirit" of the religiously devout and would discriminate against them.

It emerged on 3 February 2017 that the board of the Justice Alliance of South Africa had asked Smyth to immediately stand down as the head of the organisation. His standing down was described as temporary, but his return was not thought likely.

== Christian ministry, children's work and abuse ==
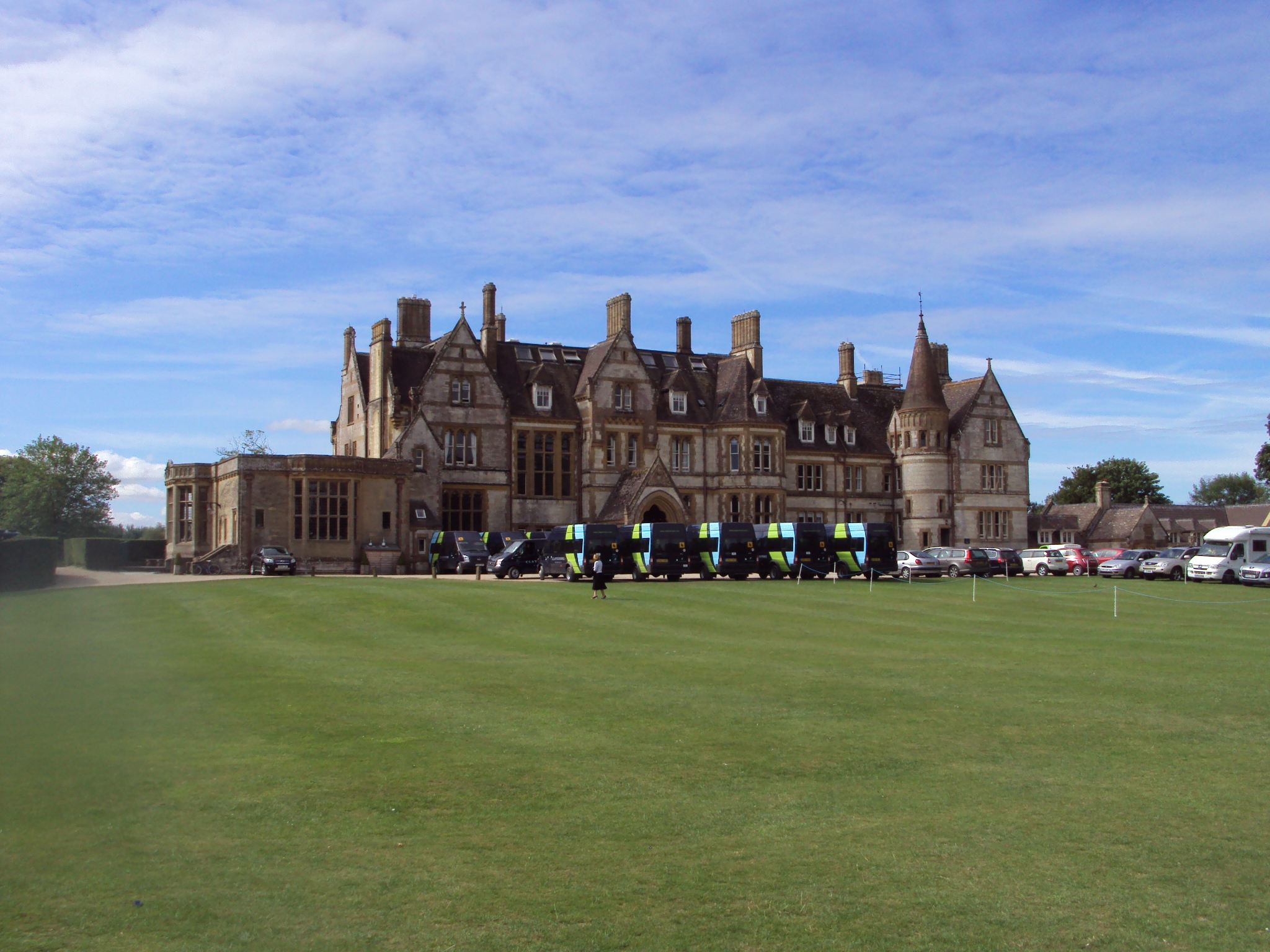
The Iwerne camps took place at the Clayesmore School from the 1940s until the early 2000s.

Having moved his family to live in Winchester, they attended Christ Church, Winchester, an evangelical Church of England church. From November 1973 to May 1974, he trained as a lay reader and, having completed his training, served at Christ Church. This made him an "office holder" in the Church of England, although readers are not ordained and remain part of the laity. He had attempted to be ordained in the Diocese of York in 1980 and in the Diocese of Winchester in 1981, and perhaps also the Diocese of Oxford, but was rejected at each attempt: the Makin Review concluded that "it is reasonable to assume that either something was known of John Smyth's abuse or he was considered to be unsuitable on account of something else". By October 1982, he was no longer listed as a lay reader in the Diocese of Winchester.

Smyth was chairman of the Iwerne Trust between 1974 and 1981. This organisation raised funds for (and in practice ran) the Iwerne camps; these were Christian holiday camps that had been founded by Eric "Bash" Nash to instruct boys from public schools (fee-paying, independent schools) in muscular Christianity and with a conservative evangelical theology, to become future Christian leaders, especially within the Church of England. Smyth first attended the camp as a university student in 1964 and acted as a leader, dormitory supervisor and lecturer. His lectures, to boys as young as 13, frequently concerned masturbation and sex.

Smyth gained access to Winchester College, then an all-boys boarding school near his home, through the Christian Forum (i.e. the school's Christian Union) from September 1973. The Makin Review identified 16 pupils who were abused and an additional six to eight who were groomed; it qualified this number with "we strongly suspect that the true figure is probably greater".

Smyth moved to Zimbabwe in 1984, where in 1986, he set up Zambesi Ministries, which held summer camps for boys from the country's leading schools. In December 1992 a 16-year-old boy, Guide Nyachuru, drowned at the Marondera camp. Nyachuru's naked body was found in the Ruzawi School swimming pool. Smyth officiated at Nyachuru's funeral. A 21-page report by lawyer David Coltart was published in October 1993 and circulated to head teachers and church leaders in Zimbabwe. Smyth was arrested in 1997 during the investigation into the drowning of Nyachuru. Smyth always said that his death was an accident. The possibility of culpable homicide was, after a long investigation, ruled as unlikely, but the incident raised concerns about Smyth's behaviour towards boys in his care. The Makin Review revealed that he had continued his abuse of boys, including "beating with table tennis bat, enforced nudity, naked swimming, and showering" and that he had given "regular lectures about masturbation".

In 2001, the Smyth family moved to South Africa. The Makin Review suggested that there "is some evidence of John Smyth continuing to groom and potentially abusing young men in South Africa".

Smyth's career in Africa was funded by millionaire Jamie Colman, son of Sir Michael Colman, 3rd Baronet, and his wife, the Revd Sue Colman. Sue Colman told the Makin Review she was aware of the allegations against Smyth, and the review concluded that both likely had "significant knowledge of the abuses in the UK and Africa". Sue Colman was at the time safeguarding minister at Holy Trinity Brompton.

=== First reports ===
An internal report from the Iwerne Trust in 1982, compiled by Mark Ruston of the Round Church Cambridge and Iwerne camp leader David Fletcher (employed by Scripture Union), referred to "horrific" beatings of "young men". According to Ruston:

The scale and severity of the practice was horrific. Five of the 13 I have seen were in it only for a short time. Between them they had 12 beatings and about 650 strokes. The other 8 received about 14,000 strokes: 2 of them having some 8,000 strokes over the three years. The others were involved for one year or 18 months. 8 spoke of bleeding on most occasions ("I could feel the blood splattering on my legs" – "I was bleeding for 3 1/2 weeks" "I fainted sometime after a severe beating"). I have seen bruised and scored buttocks, some two-and-a-half months after the beating. Beatings of 100 strokes for masturbation, 400 for pride, and one of 800 strokes for some undisclosed "fall" are recorded.

Winchester College, with its pupils among the alleged victims, was informed about the alleged beatings but both the college and the trust failed to inform the police about Smyth. The headmaster asked Smyth to keep away from the college and not to contact its pupils.

In February 1989, John Thorn, the headmaster of Winchester College during the years that Smyth was active, released his autobiography, which included the following:

I was told the extraordinary news that the neighbouring barrister had gained such personal control over a few of the senior boys in the group, and had kept it after they left the school, that he was claiming to direct their burgeoning relationships with girls, and was, with their consent, punishing them physically when they confessed to him they had sinned.

— John Thorn, The Road to Winchester

The independent review commissioned by Winchester College and published in January 2022 included the above passage from Thorn's autobiography and indicated that it was a reference to Smyth.

=== Further investigations ===
On 3 February 2017, two days after Smyth was publicly named as an abuser, Anne Atkins, an evangelical Christian, revealed via an article in The Daily Telegraph that she had referred to him, although not by name, in a 2012 article; "'I haven't handed over a sex offender to the police - because I was told in confidence': A leading agony aunt makes an explosive confession" (Daily Mail, 20 October 2012). The article included the following paragraphs:

Years ago, when I was still a child, we had a family friend who was an eminent lawyer, with considerable influence in a well-known public school. He used to invite boys to his house for Bible study. And then encourage them to confess their sins. If they admitted masturbation, for instance, he would strip and beat them, in a shed where no other adults were allowed.

When word of this got out, the parents understandably wanted to protect their sons; the school wanted to protect its reputation.

Instead of facing trial, he was allowed to leave the country quietly ... and continue the same practices abroad, where eventually he punished a boy so severely that he died. Again, I understand there was no trial.

Smyth was first publicly named as an abuser by an article in The Daily Telegraph published on 1 February 2017. The article indicated that Channel 4 News would be broadcasting a report on Smyth's violent physical abuse of young men. The report aired the next day and showed Smyth being doorstepped by reporter Cathy Newman, while on a Christmas and New Year visit to friends in Bristol, England. Smyth commented that he was "not talking about what we did at all" and said some of the claims were "nonsense".

Shortly after the report the Bishop of Guildford, Andrew Watson, disclosed that he was one of Smyth's victims.

I am one of the survivors of John Smyth's appalling activities ... the beating I endured in the infamous garden shed was violent, excruciating and shocking.

— Andrew Watson, Bishop of Guildford

After the abuse became public, Graham Tilby, national safeguarding adviser for the Church of England, said: "Clearly, more could have been done at the time to look further into the case." Smyth was excommunicated from the Church-on-Main in Cape Town after church leaders said he refused to return to the UK and engage with police.

On 10 April 2017, BBC News at Ten reported that the English first-class cricketer and Caldicott School headmaster Simon Doggart had been abused by Smyth, but he also had administered beatings alongside Smyth to other victims.

== Personal life and death ==
In January 1966, Smyth met Josephine Anne Leggott. They married on 1 June 1968, and had one son and three daughters.

Smyth died from heart failure, aged 77, on 11 August 2018, at his home in Bergvliet, South Africa, near Cape Town.

== Subsequent developments ==
In June 2020, the Church of England removed final diocesan permission to officiate from George Carey, a former Archbishop of Canterbury, having identified procedural failings either in his review of, or his failure to have other bodies review, allegations against Smyth. Permission was restored to Carey by the Bishop of Oxford seven months later.

=== Bleeding for Jesus ===
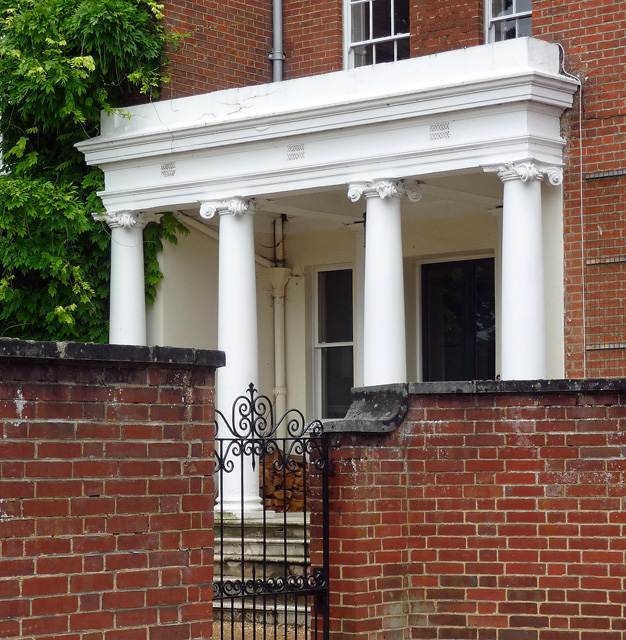
Kingsgate House, Winchester College. Smyth would collect boys from this boarding house and drive them to his house in Morestead.

A book documenting Smyth's abuse was published in September 2021. Bleeding for Jesus: John Smyth and the Cult of the Iwerne Camps was written by Andrew Graystone, a journalist and theologian who had been involved in the exposure of Smyth. Graystone described how from 1976 onwards, Smyth developed an interest in boys at Winchester College's Christian Forum, a body that grew substantially in size during the so-called "evangelical revival" at the school in the mid-1970s, with 35 out of 50 boys at one boarding house – Kingsgate House (or "Beloes"), from where Smyth selected the majority of his victims and which according to one boy "was being taken over by Smyth" – at one time attending Bible studies. Smyth attended the Christian Forum nearly every week, giving a talk each term, and he would regularly pick up two or three boys from this group from outside their boarding house and drive them to his home, Orchard House in Morestead just outside Winchester, for Sunday lunch with his family and in summer to swim, often naked, in the pool. Not all boys who attended these Sunday lunches were beaten by Smyth; those who were beaten were individually taken to a shed in his garden, where both Smyth and the boy would remove some or all of their clothes. Smyth would then beat the boy, a gym shoe being used at first, then a garden cane, with the number of strokes, as detailed in the Ruston report, initially equating to the severity of their supposed spiritual infringement, or, in Graystone's words, "related to 'specific' sins".

Over time the number of strokes increased, and the caning would be undertaken not as punishment for any particular "sinful" deed or thought but as "prophylaxis; a spiritual discipline to keep the soul in order". Adult nappies and lotion were given to boys after the beating to prevent them from bleeding on the Smyth family furniture when they returned across the garden lawn to the house. Smyth later had a special garden shed designed, soundproofed and equipped with a variety of canes. When he was carrying out a beating a white yachting pennon would be planted on the lawn so that his wife Anne and members of his family knew that he should not be disturbed. Upon returning to school, some boys refused to use the communal showers as their wounds were so extensive, and one boy, Simon Doggart, a member of Kingsgate House, had to play an important game of Winchester College football in February 1978 with bandages under his kit to hide the severe lacerations he had received from a beating that Smyth had given him for the "sin of pride".

Many of the boys whom Smyth had beaten while at Winchester College attended the Iwerne summer camps at Clayesmore School, along with boys who went to other public schools such as Eton College, Harrow School and two dozen or so other elite establishments. According to Graystone, attendance at Iwerne was "strictly regulated" on the basis of schooling, with boys who had gone to camp subsequently being "placed" as teachers in the same schools to ensure a steady flow of recruits, while at the same time maintaining the camp's credibility with parents. In 1964, Smyth was invited to be an officer at Iwerne by its founder Eric Nash, despite the fact that Smyth's school, St Lawrence College, was not among those from which boys were selected, his charisma proving sufficiently attractive. In 1975, Nash elevated Smyth to the position of Chair of the Iwerne Trust.

Graystone states that the evening Bible talks at Iwerne, in which the organisation's brand of muscular Christianity was promulgated, were the "whole point of the exercise"; Smyth gave many of these, and a young Justin Welby also gave talks, with his text being thoroughly scrutinised by Smyth and others before delivery. According to Welby, Smyth was "charming, delightful, very clever, a brilliant speaker".

After many of the boys from Winchester College whom Smyth had beaten left the school in 1979, Smyth, through his role at Iwerne, carried on inviting them to Orchard House in Morestead, where the beatings continued, and he took a group of them on holiday to St Just in Cornwall, where they rented a cottage called Bosloe: this group named themselves the "Bosloe Boys". He also visited Iwerne attendees at universities around England and now took the opportunity to meet other young men at university in Bristol, Cambridge and Durham. Smyth's relation with Simon Doggart developed at Cambridge, where a group of Iwerne men at Magdalene College met regularly at the Round Church in the city; Mark Ruston was preacher at the church and Justin Welby a regular attendee, with Welby soon starting to attend camps at Iwerne.

It was at the Iwerne camp at Clayesmore that one ex-Winchester boy, named only "Tony" by Graystone, was beaten by Smyth for a session that lasted 12 hours, to "crush his spirit"; the duration of these beatings was so exhausting for Smyth that he auditioned others to help him, settling on Simon Doggart. Doggart would be beaten by Smyth every two weeks, and at other times Doggart would beat the young men himself. Doggart was a left-handed batsman and he and Smyth occasionally conducted the beatings at the same time, delivering the strokes one after the other. In 1981, Smyth had a roster of 26 men whom, along with Doggart, he would beat, and sessions would extend up to 800 strokes at a time. Andrew Morse, son of Sir Jeremy Morse and one of the ex-Winchester "Bosloe Boys" who was beaten in Morestead every three weeks, was scheduled to have a special "double birthday beating" along with Doggart in January 1982 (they were both turning 21), but after five years of beating it was too much for Morse, so after writing and posting a letter to Smyth in which he said he would expose him to the press, on 4 February he attempted to take his own life at the University of East Anglia.

=== Pickles Review ===
In January 2022, Winchester College apologised for abuse perpetrated by Smyth, following the release of an independent review – the Pickles Review – that the college had commissioned.

The reviewers have not encountered any evidence, whether oral or documentary, which suggests that John Smyth did not commit the acts described within this report. [...] In total, the reviewers are aware of 13 former pupils of Winchester College who were abused by Smyth. Not all of the abuse involved assault or physical beatings. Some of the victims were subjected to severe emotional and spiritual abuse and inappropriate sexualised behaviour. [...] The reviewers have concluded that if Smyth had been prosecuted for the offence of assault or assault occasioning actual bodily harm in the 1980s or later on the basis of the evidence shared with the reviewers, there would have been a reasonable prospect of conviction.

— Review into the abuse by John Smyth of pupils and former pupils of Winchester College

The review also concluded that Smyth had abused boys sexually as well as physically and emotionally, citing reports of Smyth forcing victims to strip naked, striking them on the buttocks and kissing their necks, as well as stripping naked in front of them and on one occasion grabbing a teenage boy's genitals.

=== Makin Review ===
In 2024, an independent review commissioned by the Church of England concluded that Smyth had abused between 115 and 130 boys and young men.

John Smyth was an appalling abuser of children and young men. His abuse was prolific, brutal and horrific. His victims were subjected to traumatic physical, sexual, psychological and spiritual attacks. The impact of that abuse is impossible to overstate and has permanently marked the lives of his victims. John Smyth's own family are victims of his abuse.

— Keith Makin, Independent Learning Lessons Review: John Smyth QC, page 1, paragraph 1.3

Furthermore, the review found that the church had covered up the abuses of Smyth and he had been allowed to take positions abroad by church officials who knew in a general sense of the abuses. The review found the abuse had been covered up by a "powerful evangelical clergy", after becoming an open secret within the "Conservative Evangelical network" after the 1982 Ruston Report, and that senior figures within the Church of England were aware. Archbishop of Canterbury Justin Welby, who had been informed of Smyth's abuse in 2013 but took no action against him, resigned over the scandal on 12 November 2024, after some members of the General Synod had started a petition calling on him to step down.

The review contained psychological analysis by Elly Hanson, which concluded that "the beliefs and values of the conservative evangelical community in which John Smyth operated are critical to understanding how he manipulated his victims into it, how it went on for so long, and how he evaded justice." This included "intrusive and intense one-to-one mentoring of boys and young men" and "a focus on personal sinfulness, producing a default sense of guilt, defectiveness, submission and indebtedness to God".

=== PJ Smyth interview ===
On 18 November 2024, Channel 4 News broadcast an interview between Cathy Newman and Smyth's son, Peter John "PJ" Smyth, who is currently a church leader in the United States. PJ described his experiences of growing up and being abused by his father, including severe beatings in the garden shed at Orchard House, Morestead, over a period of four years, starting when PJ was seven years old. John Smyth would consult a black book that was kept in the family kitchen, listing PJ's "wrongdoings", and then say, "Peter John, it's time to go to the shed." On one occasion PJ received 36 strokes, six strokes each for six "bad reports" at school. After the beatings, PJ's mother, Anne Smyth – whom PJ called "the closest victim to him for all her adult life" – would dress his wounds with cream and adult nappies. The beatings came to a stop in 1982 when PJ was eleven, following the circulation of the secret Ruston Report. After the family moved to Zimbabwe, PJ was Guide Nyachuru's dormitory leader at Ruzawi School. He recalls skinny dipping one night with the boys in the swimming pool, and then Guide not being present in the dormitory the following morning.

After Cathy Newman's Channel 4 reports were broadcast in 2017, PJ confronted his father and said that he was willing to go on a global tour with him so that John Smyth could do the right thing and apologise to his victims. John Smyth refused and told PJ, "Stop being disloyal, it's lies and exaggeration." PJ said that the Makin Review "cemented my father as the most prolific abuser connected to the Church of England and it cemented the Church of England as needing rapid and radical changes in terms of their response to abuse".

=== See No Evil ===
In December 2025, Channel 4 broadcast See No Evil, a two-part documentary detailing Smyth's crimes, with contributions from his victims, including Mark Stibbe, Andrew Morse and "Graham", as well as members of Smyth's family: his son PJ, his daughters Fiona and Caroline, and his wife Anne, whom Fiona Smyth called "his first victim". Stibbe recalled how he thought Smyth's beatings were so severe that he might be killed: "[I] could not believe the brutality of each stroke . . . he was grunting with each blow." Anne Smyth, who started her relationship with Smyth when she was 16, described how she was helpless to stop him carrying out his abuse and that she was relieved when he died. She commented on how Christianity had shaped her reaction to her husband's abuse: "My faith had shown me and taught me that you have to focus as much as you can on the good." In the second of the two programmes, forgiveness was extended to her by PJ and Fiona, as well as by Smyth's victims. The documentary also described Channel 4's investigations into Smyth, providing a timeline of what was known by whom.
