= Iwerne camps =

British evangelical holiday camps

Iwerne and Forres Holidays

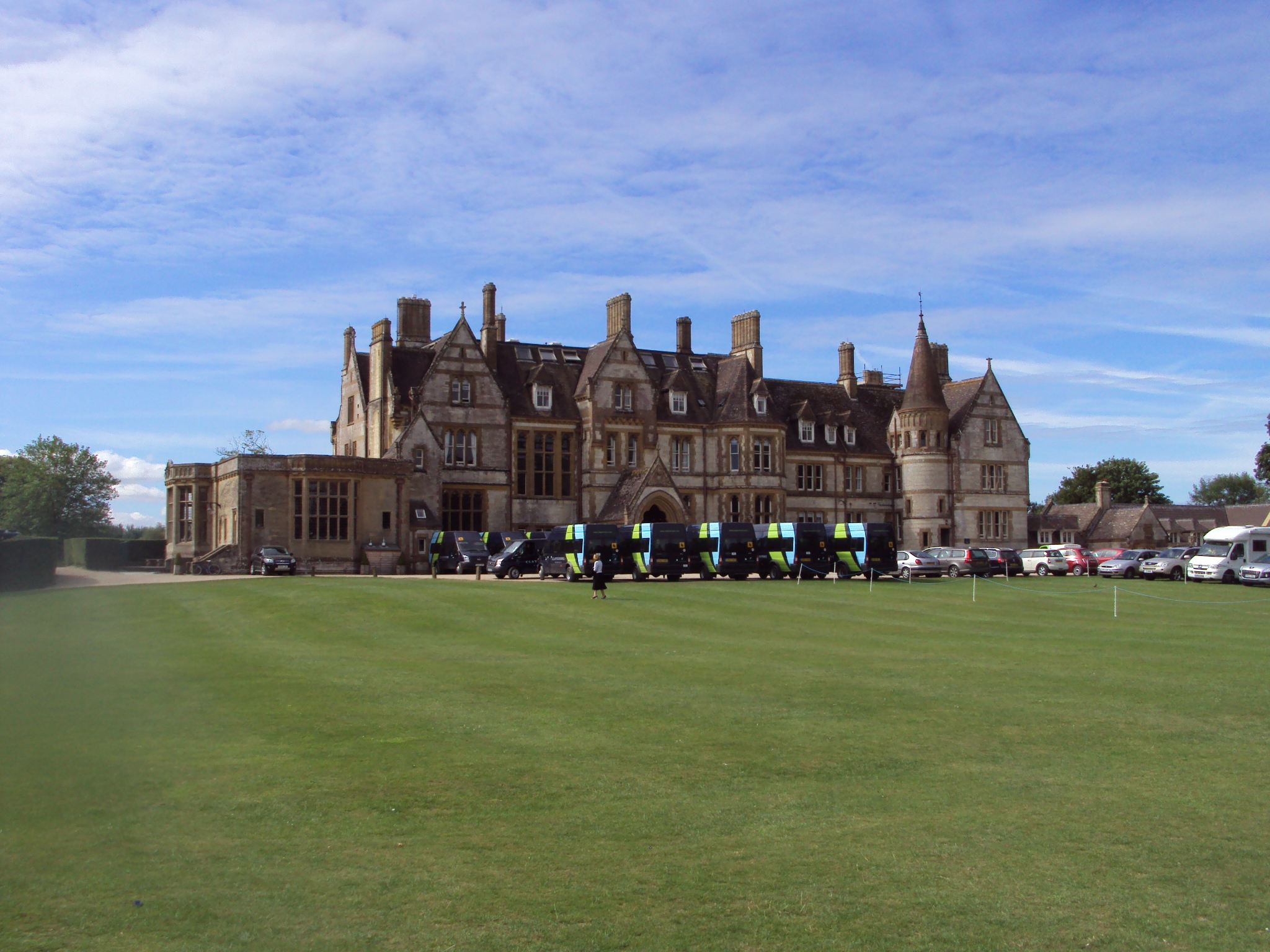
- Clayesmore School, home to Iwerne holidays from the 1940s until the early 2000s
- Nickname: Bash camps
- Status: Defunct
- Genre: Christian summer camps
- Dates: 1930-2020
- Frequency: 3 times per year
- Venue: Eastbourne, East Sussex (1930-40); Clayesmore School, Iwerne Minster (1940-early 2000s); Gresham's School, Holt, Norfolk (early 2000s-2020); (Associated camps at other venues)
- Founder: E. J. H. Nash
- Most recent: 2020
- Leader: E. J. H. Nash (1930-65); David Fletcher (1965-86); Iain Broomfield (1986-01); Paul Bolton (2001-20)
- Patrons: Scripture Union (1932-2000); Iwerne Trust (1930s-2016); Titus Trust (1997-2020)
- Website: https://www.iwerne.org/

The Iwerne camps (/ˈjuːɜːrn/ YOO-ern) were British evangelical Christian holiday camps aimed at children from UK public schools. They were officially the Varsity and Public Schools (VPS) holidays and later Iwerne and Forres Holidays, and were commonly known as Bash camps.

E. J. H. Nash ("Bash") ran his first holidays in 1930, and from around 1940 these were hosted at Clayesmore School in Iwerne Minster, Dorset. The original camps were aimed at boys from the 'top thirty' private schools. They promoted "muscular Christianity" and conservative evangelical theology, aiming to equip attendees to become Christian leaders in the Church of England. Later camps were held in other venues and aimed at girls and boys from lower-ranking private schools. The camps were influential in the British post-war evangelical resurgence, with attendees including theologian John Stott, Archbishop of Canterbury Justin Welby, bishops David Sheppard, Timothy Dudley-Smith and Maurice Wood and Alpha course founder Nicky Gumbel.

From 1932 until 2000 the holidays were nominally run under the auspices of Scripture Union, but in practice ran independently, with funding from the Iwerne Trust. In 1997, in a move to regularise oversight of the holidays, the Iwerne Trust was succeeded by the Titus Trust, which in 2000 fully took over formal responsibility for the holidays from Scripture Union. In the early 2000s the holidays moved from Iwerne Minster to Gresham's School in Norfolk, but retained the Iwerne name. In later years they were grouped with the Forres holidays for younger (prep school age) children.

In 2017, information emerged about abuse carried out in the 1970s and 1980s by Iwerne Trust chairman John Smyth against boys from the camps, with Titus Trust reaching a settlement with survivors in 2020. Further allegations followed of abuse by another Iwerne leader, Jonathan Fletcher. In 2020, the Titus Trust announced that it would cease to run holidays under the Iwerne name. The trust continues to run related holidays under its other brands. In February 2025, a Channel 4 investigation reported allegations of sexual assault and harassment of girls and women by David Fletcher, leader of Iwerne and Titus Trust trustee.

== Theology ==
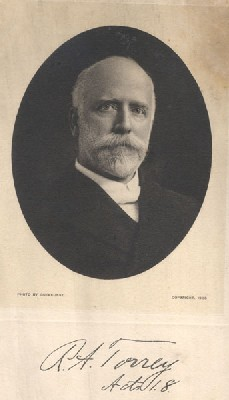
R. A. Torrey, a key influence on Iwerne theology

Nash used a simple "A, B, C" formula to explain what needed to be done for conversion: "Admit your need of Christ; Believe that Christ died for you; Come to Him." The talks, morning and evening, were described by one attendee as "a wonderfully clear, biblically faithful and winsome presentation of the Christian gospel of salvation."

Nash considered American evangelist R. A. Torrey (1856-1928) to be his theological mentor, and valued the Keswick Convention, encouraging his leaders to attend. In line with Keswick thought, Nash spoke of "being dead to sin" (Romans 6:7) using the analogy of a dead dog in the gutter: "A touch of the foot would show if it was only sleeping: it would instantly respond where a dead dog would not." One of Nash's favourite books was Torrey's Why God Used D. L. Moody.

== The Nash era (1930–65) ==
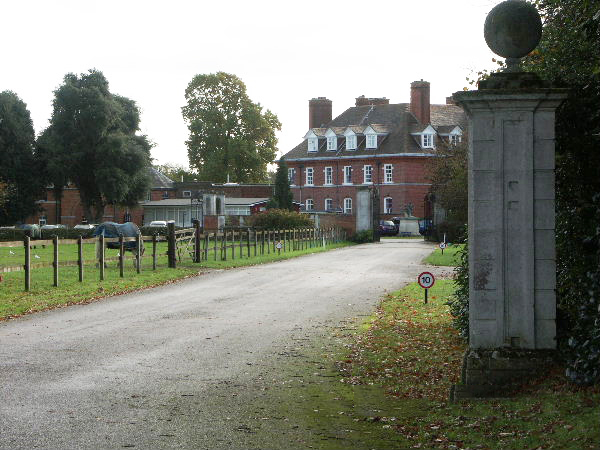
Walhampton School, Lymington, originally the venue for camps for boys from minor public schools

In 1930, conservative evangelical cleric and Wrekin College school chaplain E. J. H. Nash (1898–1982), known as "Bash", ran a camping holiday for 33 public school boys near Eastbourne, East Sussex. In 1932, Nash was appointed as a staff member of Scripture Union and the holidays came under the auspices of the charity, with Nash as the charity's first dedicated independent schools worker. The holidays ran separately from Scripture Union's other holidays under the brand Varsity and Public Schools holidays (VPS), with Scripture Union's name rarely used.

The Home Missionary Trust was founded in the 1930s to fund the holidays. In 1945 this became the Iwerne Trust, which was registered as a charity in 1963.

After the outbreak of the Second World War, due to the proximity of their Eastbourne location to Battle of Britain flight paths, the holidays moved to Clayesmore School in the village of Iwerne Minster, Dorset, which would give the camps their name and remain their home for over 60 years.

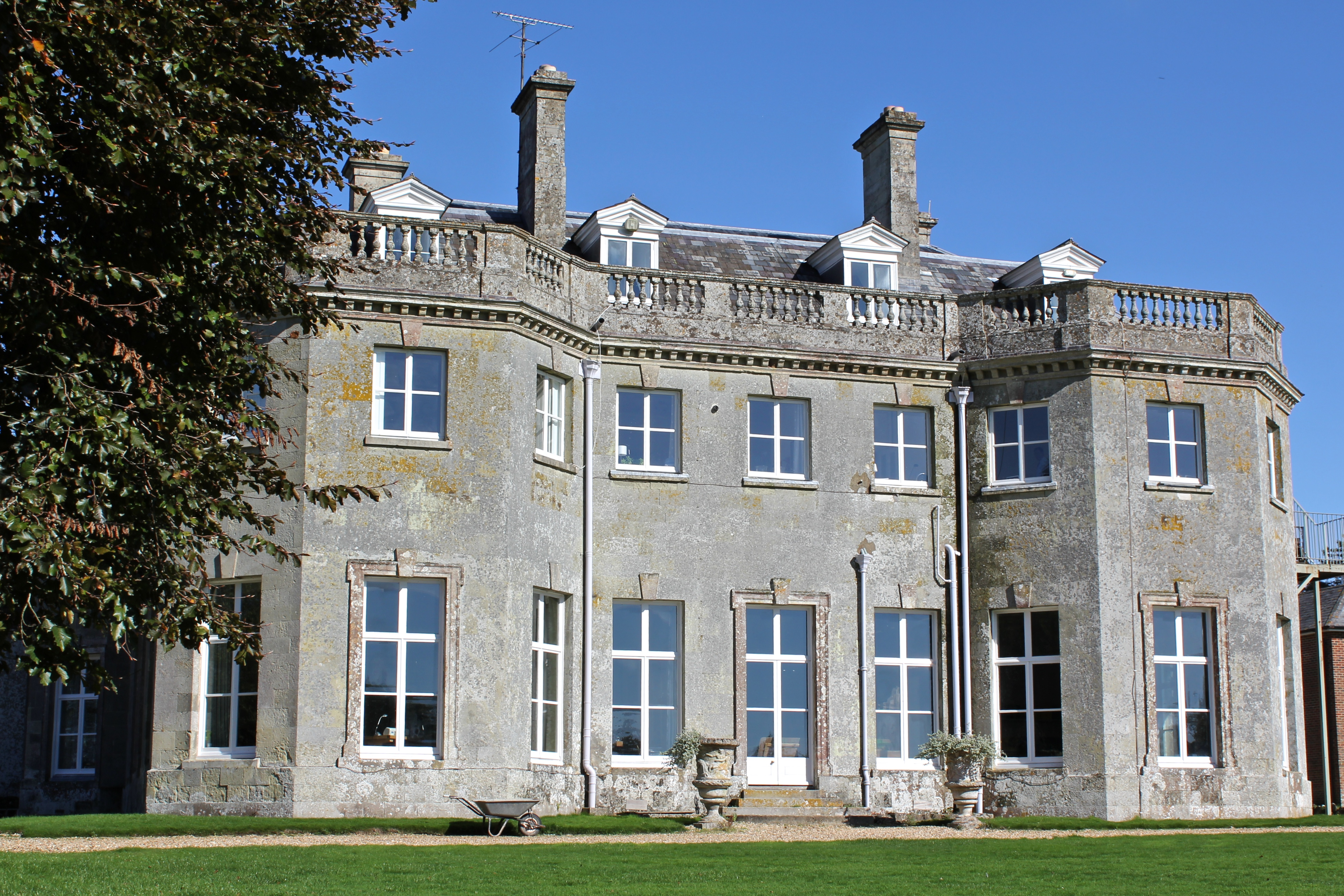
Sandroyd School, Rushmore, originally the venue for girls' camps

The holidays aimed to preach the Christian Gospel at the top thirty British public schools. Attendance was by invitation only. Nash used military terminology: he was known as commandant, his deputy, adjutant and the leaders were officers. His prayer was "Lord, we claim the leading public schools for your kingdom." Unobtrusive, yet highly strategic, the enterprise involved simple Bible teaching accompanied by personal friendship and pastoral care. Additional camps began at Walhampton School near Lymington, Hampshire for the second tier of public schools, and at Sandroyd School in Rushmore Park, Dorset for girls.

Randle Manwaring (in a book later criticised as offering "more partisan pieties than it does historical analysis") wrote:

The keynotes of Iwerne were always very simple bible teaching and pastoral care through strongly developed friendships at all levels. Attendance was by invitation only and limited to boys at major public schools, at least boarding schools. The unofficial, sotto voce, slogan of the ‘Bash Camps’ (Bash being the very affectionate name given to E. J. H. Nash) was ‘key boys from key schools’ and, whilst this strategy of creating a patrician, elitist Christian society was criticised by many, the results were most remarkable.

Nash secured the support of headmasters by recruiting the Christian staff of their schools to his camp. Although he was an Anglican visiting Church of England institutions, his message was not necessarily welcome, as many parents would not have been open to their children embracing Evangelical religion. John Stott describes the meetings at Rugby as "strictly off the record and conducted with a good deal of secrecy". Nash lent his favourite books out, (often by R. A. Torrey) covered in brown paper to disguise them. His approach was shaped by methods common to Evangelical circles in North America, including an expectation of definite decisions for Christ, inquiries into people's spiritual state, a "lack of interest in social issues" and "a large dose of self-denying otherworldliness." This heritage, and the link to the United States was awkward. Nash emphasised the need for a personal encounter with Jesus, and this "upset one of the ruling assumptions of places like Rugby - that Christianity was the cultural birthright of any Englishman baptised and confirmed in the Church of England."

Nash wrote many letters to young men from the Iwerne camps. John Stott reports: "His letters to me often contained a rebuke, for I was a wayward young Christian and needed to be disciplined. In fact, so frequent were his admonitions at one period, that whenever I saw his familiar writing on an envelope, I needed to pray and prepare myself for half an hour before I felt ready to open it." Nash focused on those individuals that he felt had special leadership qualities, "not from snobbery, but from strategy." According to Bishop David Sheppard, Nash would pray "Lord, we know that thou dost love one talent and two talent men, but we pray that thou wouldst give us a five talent man."

Nash remained on the staff of Scripture Union until 1965 when he stepped down from overall leadership of the camps, though he continued to attend and speak at the camps into his late 70s. He died on 4 April 1982, a few weeks before his 84th birthday.

== The Fletcher and post-Fletcher era (1965-97) ==
After Nash stepped down in 1965, David Fletcher (son of Labour politician Eric Fletcher) became responsible for the camps,

The holidays were, in theory, run under the auspices of Scripture Union, with the Iwerne Trust as merely a fundraising organisation. However, by time of David Fletcher's leadership, the holidays were in practice run as an independent operation, with no meaningful oversight from Scripture Union. Its senior leaders remained legally employed by Scripture Union, but were paid with money provided by the Iwerne Trust, and in practice understood their loyalty to be to the Iwerne operation, with Scripture Union seen as a separate organisation that provided administrative support.

Fletcher stepped down from overall leadership of the holidays in 1986, when he became vicar of St Ebbe's Church, Oxford. He became chairman of the Iwerne Trust, serving until the trust's closure in 2016, as well as becoming a trustee of the Titus Trust on its formation in 1997.

In February 2025, a Channel 4 investigation reported allegations of sexual assault and harassment of girls and women by David Fletcher.

=== John Smyth ===
John Smyth (1941–2018), a barrister best known for acting for Mary Whitehouse in her 1977 private prosecution for blasphemy against the newspaper Gay News, was a camp leader on the Iwerne camps from 1964 to 1984, chair of the Iwerne Trust 1974–81, and a Scripture Union trustee 1971–79.

In 1979, according to a Iwerne Trust report, Smyth began to carry out beatings on boys from Winchester School and from the Iwerne camps. The report found Smyth targeted pupils from leading public schools and took them to his home near Winchester in Hampshire, where he carried out lashings with a garden cane in his shed. It said eight of the boys received a total of 14,000 lashes, while two more received 8,000 strokes between them over three years.

Smyth's actions were reported in 1982 to the Iwerne Trust, which carried out its own internal report, compiled by Mark Ruston, vicar of the Round Church Cambridge and Iwerne camp commandant David Fletcher (employed by Scripture Union). This report detailed abuse against 22 young men, and led to Smyth's removal from involvement in Iwerne, but the findings were not communicated to the police until 2013, and the report was not made public until 2016.

Smyth fled the United Kingdom in 1984 and moved to Zimbabwe, where in 1986 he set up summer camps for boys from the country's leading schools, with funding from the UK. In 1992 a 16-year-old boy, Guide Nyachuru, drowned at the Marondera camp, and subsequent investigations revealed that Smyth had engaged in corporal punishment as well as nudity with boys on the camps, and uncovered the 1982 Ruston Report. Smyth was charged with culpable homicide, but succeeded in having the charges shelved in 1997. However, he was placed on a 30-day temporary visa, and in 2001 was refused re-entry to Zimbabwe. He and his wife then moved to Durban and later to Cape Town, South Africa, where he ran the Justice Alliance of South Africa for some years.

== Titus Trust, move to Norfolk, abuse revelations and closing of Iwerne (1997-2020) ==
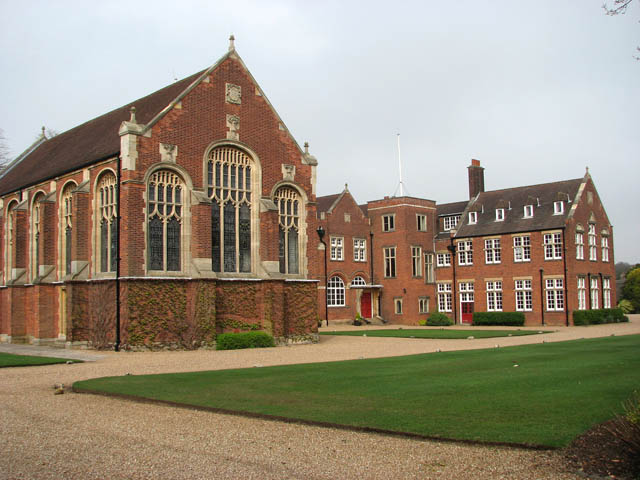
Gresham's School, later home of the holidays

The Titus Trust was set up in 1997 to replace the Iwerne Trust, with the aim of clarifying the previously confused relationship between Scripture Union and the trust. In 2000 it took full control of the running of the holidays, with Scripture Union ceasing to be involved. The Iwerne Trust continued to exist until 2016, with some of the same trustees as Titus Trust and channelling its income to the Titus Trust.

In the early 2000s, the camps moved from Clayesmore School in Iwerne Minster to Gresham's School, Holt, Norfolk, but retained the Iwerne name.

Revd Paul Bolton was overall leader of the holidays in their final years, as a Titus Trust employee from 2001-21, after which he left to become a curate at St Ebbe's Church, Oxford.

=== Revelation of John Smyth's abuse ===
In 2013, the report which had been completed on John Smyth's abuse by the Iwerne Trust in 1982 was communicated to the police, and in 2016 it was made public. An investigation by Channel 4 News in February 2017 revealed reports of abuse by Smyth against at least 22 boys.

Smyth died in 2018. Following his death, the Titus Trust released a statement saying it was "deeply regrettable that John Smyth's death has robbed his victims of the opportunity to see justice done". The trust said that its board had been informed of the allegations in 2014, and since then had done all it could to ensure the matter was investigated.

A statement was issued by advocate Andrew Graystone on behalf of a group of survivors who described themselves as 'amongst the scores of victims'. The statement said the survivors were "appalled" by the Trust statement and disputed the assertion that the Trust had done all it could to ensure Smyth was properly investigated, as well as its statement that the Trust was only notified of the allegations in 2014. The survivors went on to say that the Trust had refused to engage with victims, show concern for their well-being, or offer support, and that the survivors "do not believe [Titus Trust] are fit to work with children".

In 2018 there were calls for an independent inquiry into both the abuse, and the culture of the Trust that enabled John Smyth to evade justice despite awareness amongst so many trustees, associated clergy and senior figures within the Church of England. In August 2018, it was reported that a group of survivors had launched a legal claim against the Titus Trust, who were running the Iwerne Trust camps. The group of men who launched this action said that the Trust had remained silent since the allegations about Smyth emerged. They engaged Richard Scorer to act for them.

In March 2020 the Titus Trust reached a settlement with three men "who have suffered for many years because of the appalling abuse of John Smyth". The Trust expressed “profound regret” for the abuse, and apologised for “additional distress” caused by the way it responded to the allegations. A group of Smyth's victims called in response for the trust to disband, as it had protected its own interests rather than offering care and support to victims.

The Church of England commissioned the Makin Review into its handling of the abuse allegations. After protracted delays, the review was published in November 2024. Justin Welby, the Archbishop of Canterbury, was criticised in the review and resigned shortly afterwards.

=== Closure ===
In 2020, after the John Smyth and Jonathan Fletcher abuse reports, the trust announced that it would be closing down the Iwerne brand. It continues to run holidays under other brands (Lymington Rushmore, Gloddaeth and LDN), some of which originally descended from the Iwerne camps.

== Influence ==
Nash's approach was reminiscent of J. C. Ryle's "reach the few to reach the many" strategy used to counteract the rise of Anglo-Catholicism within the academy. David Fletcher remembers "Bash was told that his work would never succeed because it is hard for the rich to enter the Kingdom of Heaven, but Jesus went on to say that with God all things are possible."

The Iwerne camp influence also stretched to University Christian Unions in the Inter-Varsity Fellowship. Between 1935 and 1939 all the presidents of the Cambridge Inter-Collegiate Christian Union were 'Bash' campers, and, according to scholar David Goodhew, "the union was marked by [Nash's] methods: a very simple evangelical gospel; meticulous preparation; a wariness of emotions or intellect and assiduous 'personal work' before and after conversion."

John King said: "Many 'Bash campers' went from school to Cambridge and became pillars of the Cambridge Inter-Collegiate Christian Union, so that it was possible, when the movement was at its zenith for a boy to go from public school to Cambridge, to ordination, to a curacy and to a parish of his own without encountering the kind of life lived outside those particular circles..." Some have noted that Nash created an "oddly male, oddly elitist, and oddly simplistic world." In 1969, it could be said that much of the leadership of the British Evangelical church had been "Bash campers". King goes on to say that in order to understand the Evangelical mind, therefore, it was necessary to understand the "Bash camp" mind:

Controversy is eschewed by "Bash campers"; it is held to be noisy and undignified - and potentially damaging. As a result many issues which ought to be faced are quietly avoided. Any practical decisions that must be made are taken discreetly by the leadership and passed down the line. The loyalty of the rank and file is such that decisions are respected; any who question are liable to find themselves outside the pale... It does not give a place to the process of argument, consultation and independent thought which are essential to any genuine co-operation, inside the church or outside it.

Bishop David Sheppard remarked that Nash could be "single-minded to the point of ruthlessness" and "courageous in challenging people about their actions or priorities," but that this could become "over-direction"; some even needed to make a complete break in order to be free of his influence.

Even if some cast doubt on his "rigid focus" and his hope for a national "trickle-down effect" in 2005 John Stott, his most famous protégé, was ranked among the 100 most influential people in the world by Time magazine. Alister McGrath describes Nash and his ministry as one of the factors leading to the post-war Evangelical renaissance, saying his work "laid the nucleus for a new generation of Evangelical thinkers and leaders."

=== Alpha course ===
The Alpha course founder Nicky Gumbel participated in the camps under David Fletcher's leadership. Fletcher described Alpha as: "basically the Iwerne camp talk scheme with charismatic stuff added on." Rob Warner says: "Alpha can therefore be summed up as Bash camp rationalistic conservatism combined with Wimberist charismatic expressivism... this is a highly unusual, even paradoxical hybrid." Gumbel himself will only admit an indirect link. Andrew Atherstone says "parts of Gumbel's Alpha course had their roots in the basic gospel foundations provided by Iwerne."

== Notable attendees and leaders ==
- Sir Fred Catherwood (1925-2014), Conservative Member of the European Parliament (1979-94) and writer
- Henry Chadwick (1920-2008), theologian, Dean of Christ Church Cathedral, Oxford (1969-79)
- John T. C. B. Collins (1925-2022), vicar of Holy Trinity Brompton (1980-5)
- John Dewes (1926-2015), England cricketer and Dulwich College housemaster
- Timothy Dudley-Smith (1926-2024), Bishop of Thetford (1981-92) and hymnwriter
- Colin Fletcher (1950-), Bishop of Dorchester (2000-20)
- Michael Green (1930-2019), theologian, advisor to the Archbishops on the Decade of Evangelism
- Nicky Gumbel (1955-), curate (1986-2005) and vicar of Holy Trinity Brompton (2005-22) and Alpha Course founder
- Dick Lucas (1925-), vicar of St Helen's Bishopsgate (1961-98) and founder of the Proclamation Trust
- John Pollock (1924-2012), author, official biographer of Billy Graham
- Vaughan Roberts (1965-), vicar of St Ebbe's Church, Oxford (1998-) (previously curate, under David Fletcher) and director of the Proclamation Trust
- David Sheppard (1929-2005), England cricketer and Bishop of Liverpool (1975-97)
- John Stott (1921-2011), theologian, rector of All Souls, Langham Place (1950-75)
- Richard Tice (1964-), businessman, Reform UK MP and deputy leader and GB News presenter.
- David Watson (1933-84), evangelist, vicar of St Michael le Belfrey, York (1973-82)
- Justin Welby (1956-), Archbishop of Canterbury (2013-2024)
- Maurice Wood (1916-2007), Bishop of Norwich (1971-85)
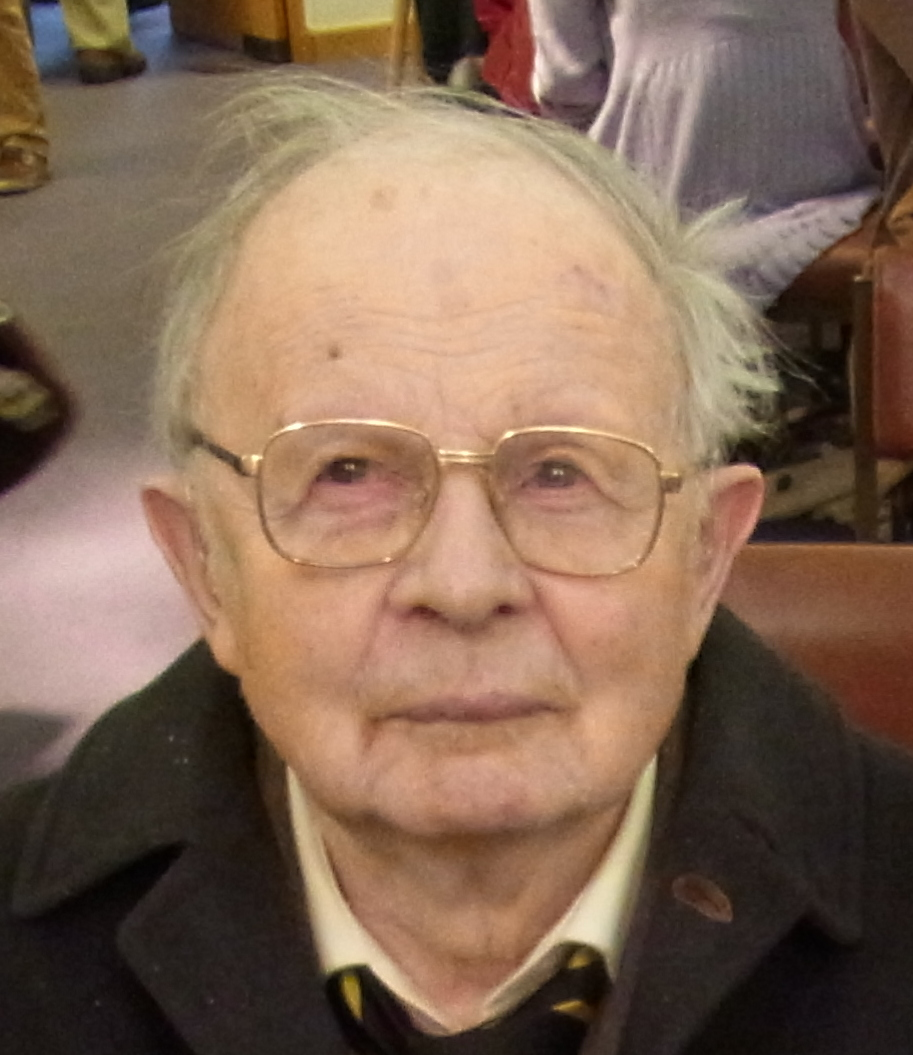
Fred Catherwood

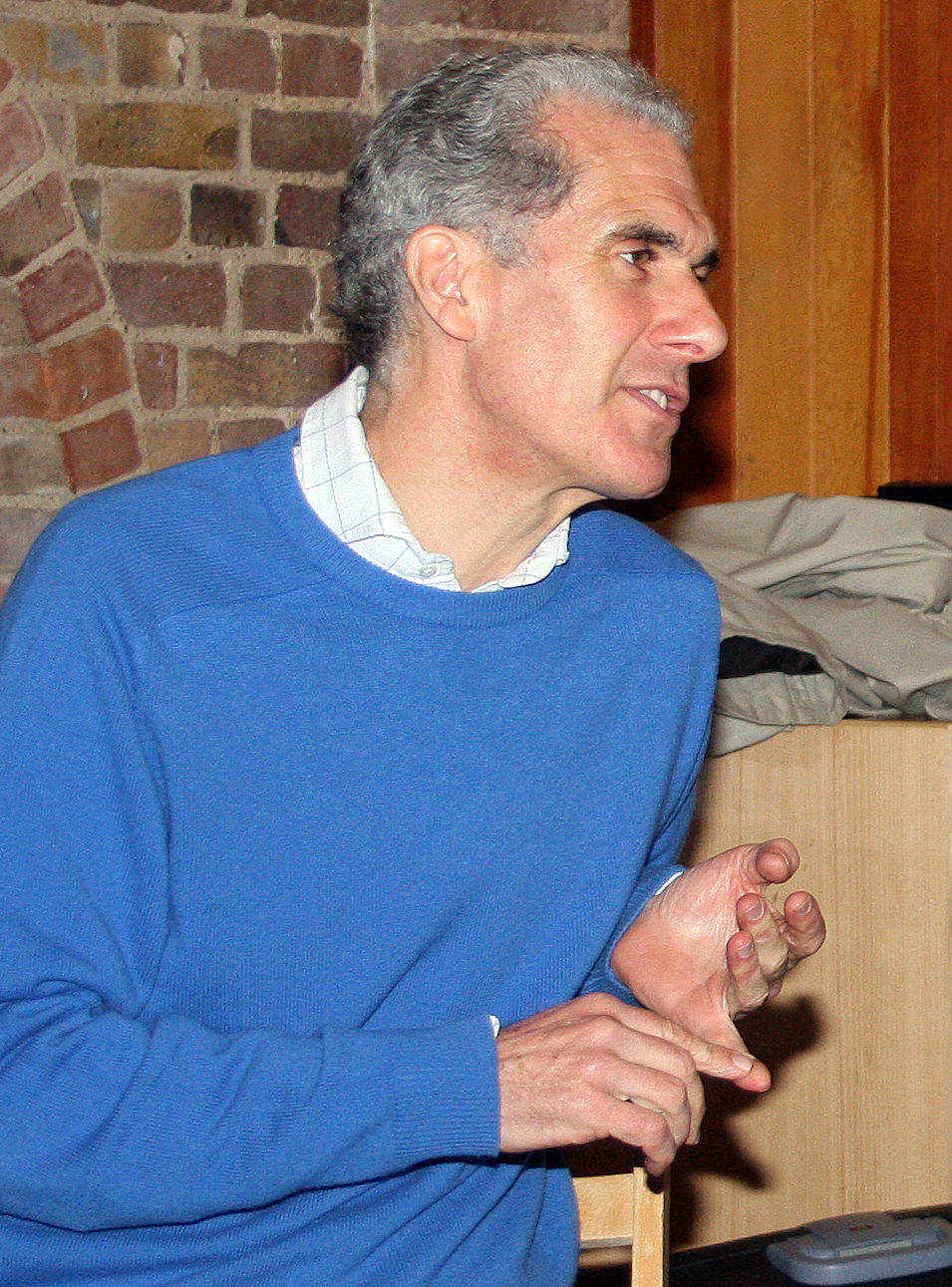
Nicky Gumbel

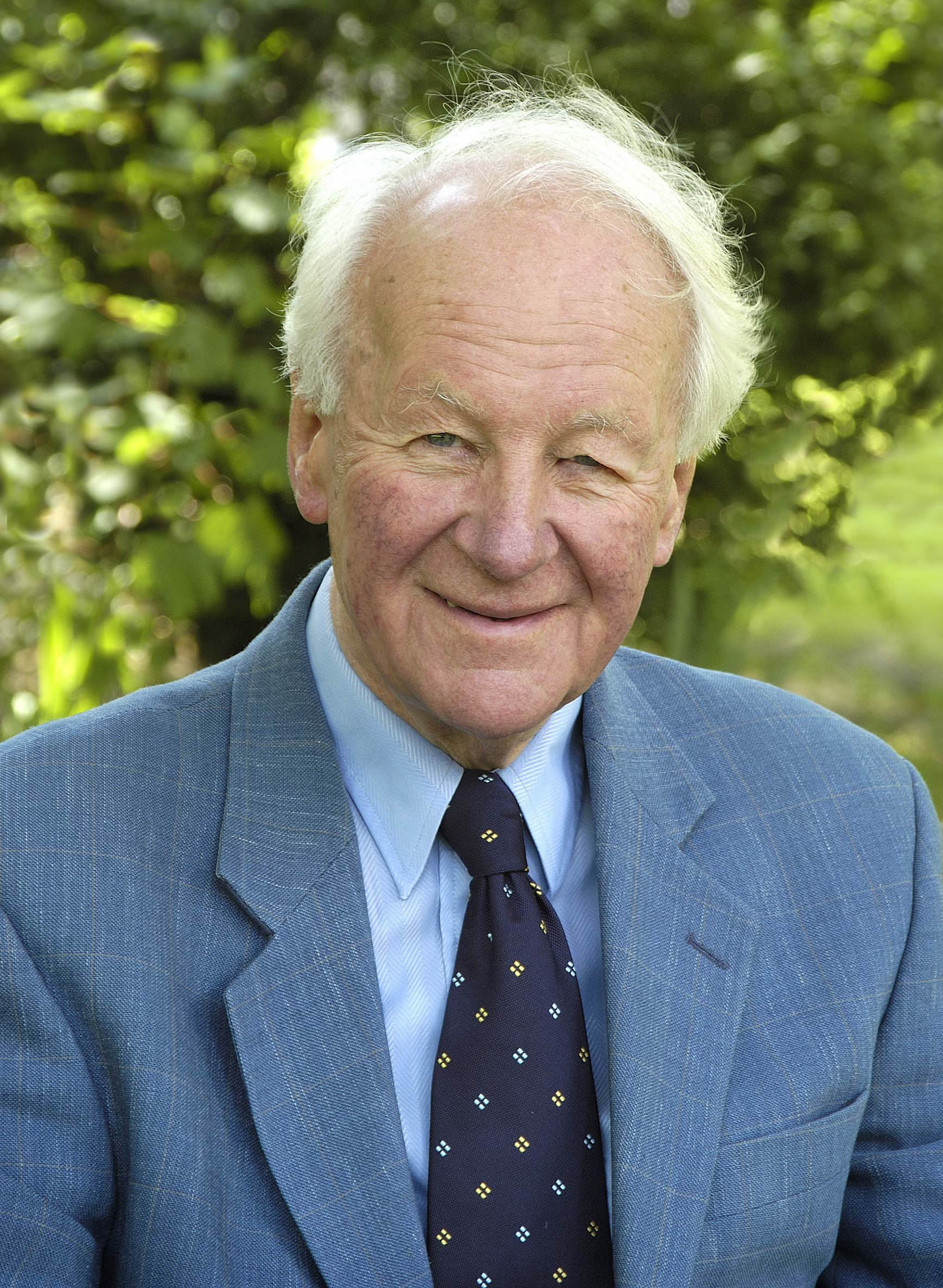
John Stott

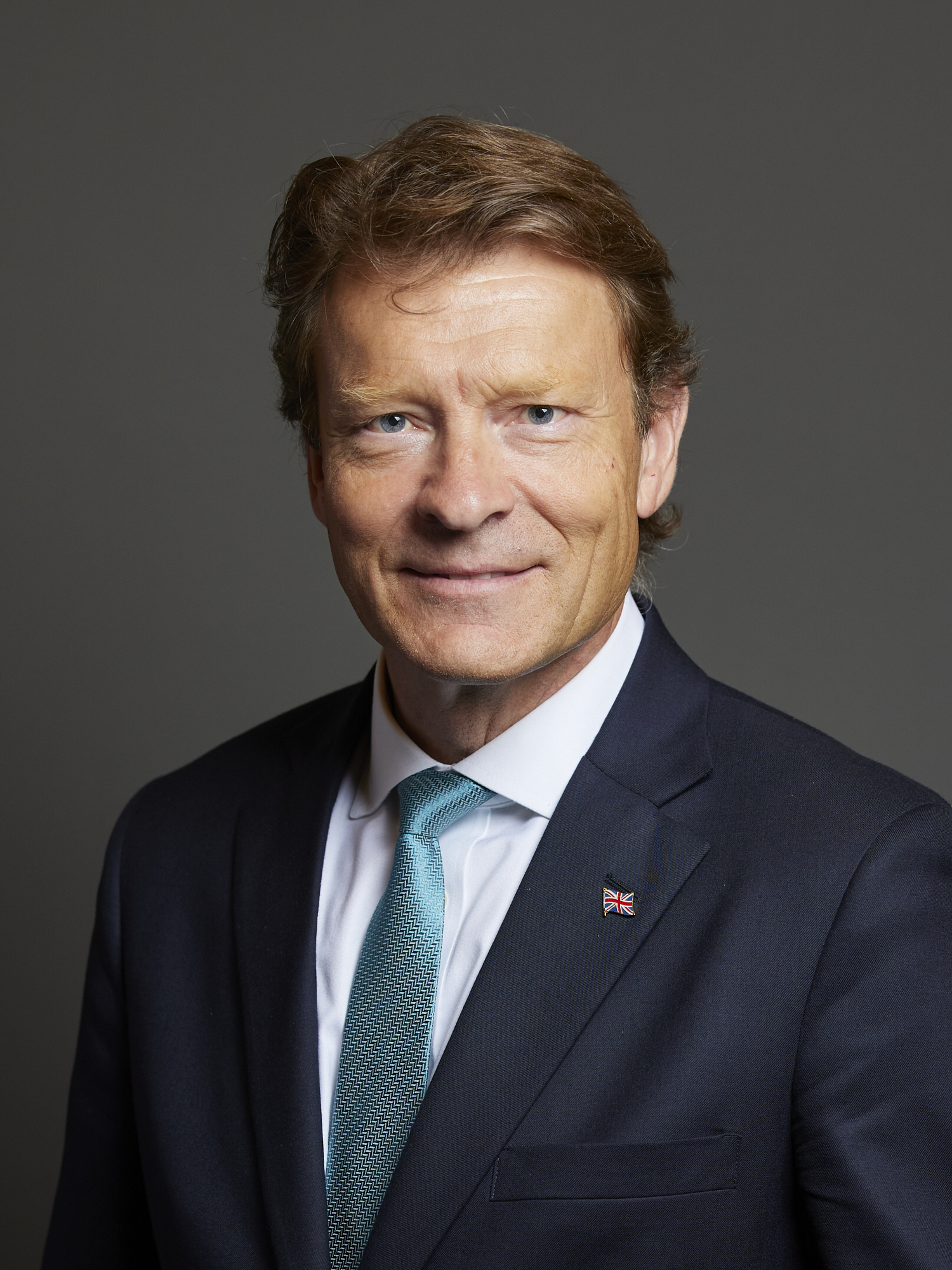
Richard Tice

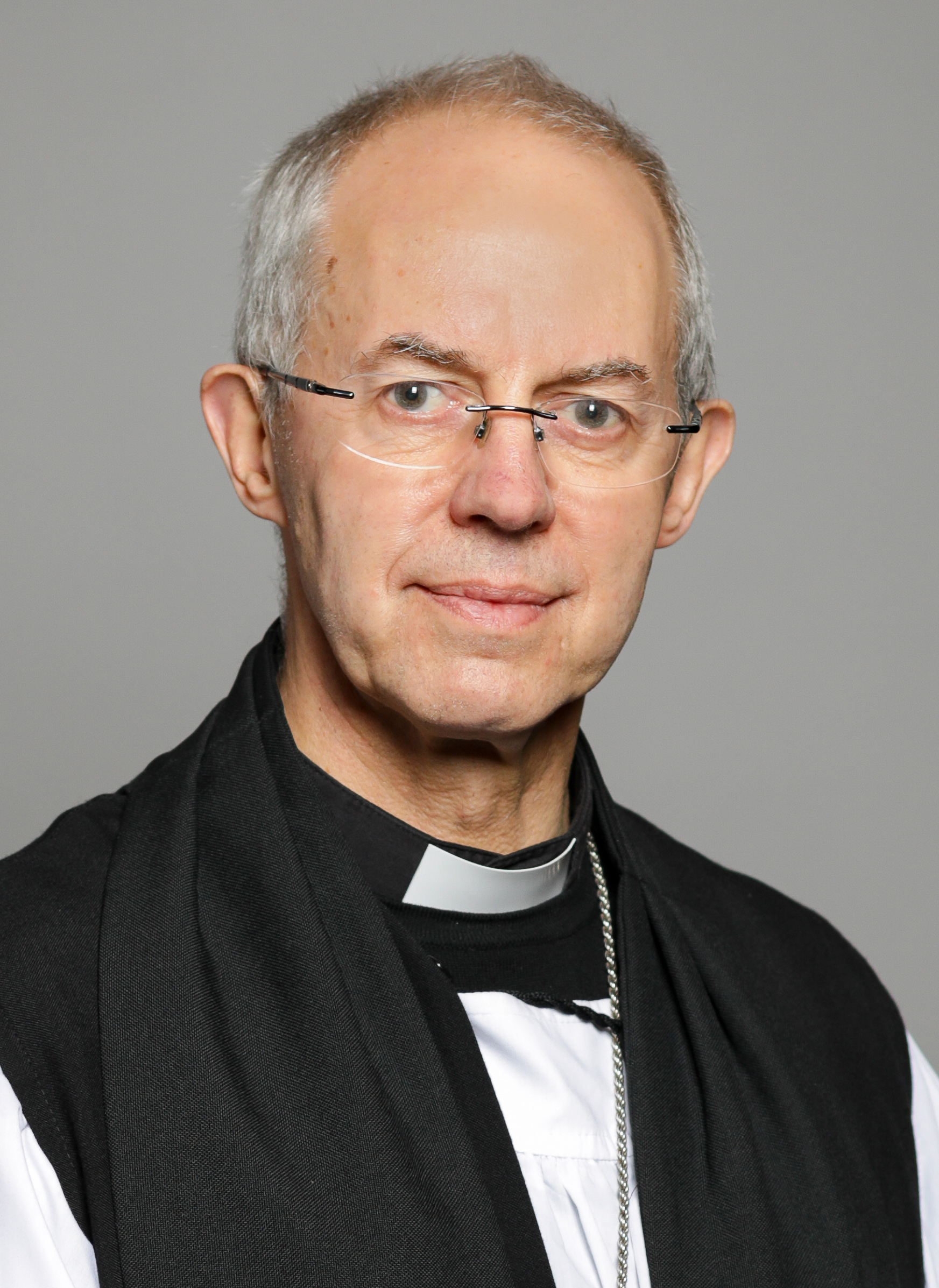
Justin Welby
