= Graham Tilby =

- Occupation: National Advisor
- Years active: 2014 - current
- Employer: Church of England
- Known for: Safeguarding

Graham Tilby is the National Advisor on Safeguarding for the Church of England. He was appointed by Paul Butler, Bishop of Durham, in November 2014.

== Dudley Safeguarding ==
Tilby worked in Dudley as Quality Development Manager in children's services before becoming Divisional Lead for Safeguarding. An Ofsted inspection in April 2016 identified "serious and widespread failures" in services for children and young people in Dudley. The report said:

The long period of inaction means that many services have deteriorated since the last inspection.

Mike Wood, Conservative MP for Dudley South, said of the Ofsted conclusions:

Obviously what it highlights is quite how little has been done to improve the care of vulnerable children over the last four years, and that's of huge concern to everyone living in Dudley.

Tilby also worked as a Local Authority Designated Officer (LADO) before becoming an Ofsted HM Inspector for 11 months.

== Church of England National Advisor ==
In April 2016 a survivor of abuse by convicted bishop Peter Ball objected to treatment received from senior church officials. He declined to take part in the Independent Peter Ball Review led by Dame Moira Gibb, because "bullying and silencing" were not included in the terms of reference. He reportedly rejected the offer of a meeting with Tilby because he was dissatisfied with the church's response to his complaints.

Tilby faced questioning in the Chichester hearings from the Independent Inquiry into Child Sexual Abuse (IICSA) panel in 2018, following a comprehensive and critical review by Mandate Now of the Church of England's safeguarding policy which the campaigning group termed a “thicket of inconsistent discretionary advice” with any clear procedures on reporting and compliance “hidden like needles in a haystack”. Richard Scorer, one of the solicitors for survivors at IICSA, later criticised Tilby for his reluctance to change the church's “fundamentally unsound structure”.

Tilby came under criticism from Dr Martyn Percy, Dean of Christchurch Oxford, for his treatment of Bishop George Bell’s niece and family. Tilby had assigned them an advocate without their consultation. Tilby’s choice of representative had previously been part of a Church of England process, discredited in the Carlile Review which had exposed "embarrassing levels of incompetence" in the National Safeguarding Team ‘Core Group’. Bishop Bell's niece and family had made it clear that they wanted their interests and the memory of Bishop Bell to be represented by Desmond Browne QC. Dr Percy also criticised the church's apologies which he said were a “disingenuous public relations exercise, designed to cover-up institutional mistakes and flaws.”

In December 2018, William Nye, the Secretary General of the Church of England Synod, announced a new appointment of Director of Safeguarding. This new role will be senior to that of the National Advisor and will report directly to William Nye. Sir Roger Singleton was announced as interim director of the National Safeguarding Team from the beginning of January 2019 whilst recruitment is in process.

== See also ==
- Anglican Church sexual abuse cases
- William Nye (courtier)
