= Cathy Newman =

English journalist (born 1974)

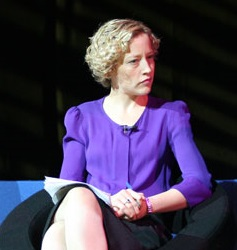
- Newman in 2012
- Born: Catherine Elizabeth Newman; 14 July 1974 (age 52); Guildford, Surrey, England
- Education: Charterhouse
- Alma mater: Lady Margaret Hall, Oxford (BA)
- Occupations: Journalist, news presenter
- Years active: 1997–present
- Known for: Sky News (2026–present); Channel 4 News (2006–2026)
- Spouse: John O'Connell (m. 2001)
- Children: 2

Catherine Elizabeth Newman (born 14 July 1974) (Note: "Newman, Cathy". WHO'S WHO and WHO WAS WHO. A&C Black. 2018. doi:10.1093/ww/9780199540884.013.U249479. ISBN 978-0-19-954088-4. Archived from the original on 4 April 2019.) is an English journalist, and presenter. Since April 2026, she has presented a Sky News evening politics show. She also presents a programme once a week on Times Radio. She began her career as a newspaper journalist, and had spells at Media Week, The Independent, the Financial Times and The Washington Post. She worked for Channel 4 News from 2006 to 2026, initially as a correspondent and from 2011, as a presenter.

In 2018, she released Bloody Brilliant Women: The Pioneers, Revolutionaries and Geniuses Your History Teacher Forgot to Mention, a book detailing the lives of women in Britain in the 20th and 21st centuries. In 2020, she released It Takes Two: A History of the Couples Who Dared to be Different, a book about how great pairs, from rivals to romantic couples, have made history.

== Early life and education ==
Born in Guildford, Surrey, Newman is the younger daughter of David Newman and Julia Worsdall, both chemistry teachers, and has one older sister. She attended a fee-paying girls school in Guildford until the age of 16, when she joined Charterhouse, where her father taught, as one of a few girls admitted to the school's sixth form. She has said that she stayed silent for years about the sexual harassment and other humiliation she experienced from fellow pupils. She was on the path to a career as a violinist or in the legal profession before changing her plans as a result of seeing BBC journalist Kate Adie on television. Newman read English at Lady Margaret Hall, Oxford, where she graduated with first-class honours.

== Career ==
=== Early career ===
Following university, Newman briefly worked on The Guardian's Books section, then at Media Week (as a trainee) and The Independent (as media business correspondent) before joining the Financial Times (FT) at the age of 23. Her older colleague Alice Rawsthorn acted as a mentor at the FT, where Newman worked as a media and then (for three years) political correspondent. While Newman was working at the FT, David Yelland, the editor of The Sun, offered her a slot called "Better than Lex" (named after Lex, a column in the Financial Times). She seriously considered the offer, but later declined; the experience led to further opportunities in political journalism. Newman began a television career in 2000. She gained a Laurence Stern fellowship to work at The Washington Post for four months. During her period in the US, she followed the 2000 presidential campaign of Green Party candidate Ralph Nader.

=== Channel 4 News ===
Newman joined Channel 4 News in January 2006 as a political correspondent and deputy to political editor Gary Gibbon. She asked Peter Mandelson at the Brighton Labour Party conference in 2009, whether he had used the "c" word in a conversation with Rebekah Brooks, the CEO of News International.

From 2013 to 2015, Newman's pursuit of a story about the allegations of improper conduct levelled at Lord Rennard, once a leading figure in the Liberal Democrats, included her participation in an LBC local London radio phone-in on 27 February 2013 to quiz deputy prime minister Nick Clegg on the issue. Newman has commented that sexism was endemic at Westminster during her period as a lobby correspondent there, but has also said that the newspaper industry is even worse. She told Natasha Lunn in an interview for Red magazine in 2016: "As a woman in the media I feel a duty to make sure we report those issues. I've always wanted to right injustices; I suppose what's changed is I've now got a keener sense of how journalists can hold power to account". The victim of online sexism for her work, Newman gave her support for "public humiliation" of trolls in 2013: "the best way to tackle these people is to publicly humiliate them".

A regular commentator on politics in other media outlets, Newman has appeared as a guest panellist on Have I Got News for You and blogs for The Daily Telegraph and Economia magazine.

Newman was long-listed for the Orwell Prize (Journalism) in 2010 and again in 2011 for the Blog Prize. She was announced as one of the judges for the Baileys Women's Prize for Fiction in 2015.

In February 2015, Newman tweeted that she was "ushered onto the street" for being female when she went to the South London Islamic Centre for a "Visit My Mosque" programme. The mosque started receiving violent threats from the public as the story spread. A spokesperson for the Hyderi Islamic Centre had said Newman had simply visited the wrong address, and CCTV footage showed Newman had left the building of her own accord. Newman and Channel 4 News editor Ben de Pear later apologised, acknowledging that Newman had mistakenly visited the wrong building.

On 8 September 2022, she interrupted Channel 4's scheduled programme to announce the death of Queen Elizabeth II, following an announcement from Buckingham Palace earlier in the day.

==== Jordan Peterson interview ====
On 16 January 2018, Newman interviewed Canadian psychologist and author Jordan Peterson. The interview covered topics such as gender equality, including the gender pay gap, freedom of speech, and transgender rights. Short clips, gifs and memes of the fiery back-and-forth subsequently went viral, especially Newman's repeated use of the line "So you're saying..." —an utterance made 35 times during the 29-minute interview.

Many YouTube commenters were critical of Newman, a large number of them saying she had "a preconceived and misplaced grasp of Peterson's views", wrote Jamie Doward of The Guardian. New York Times columnist David Brooks criticized Newman for not listening to Peterson and for "distort[ing], simplif[ying] and restat[ing] his views to make them appear offensive and cartoonish".

Channel 4 News editor Ben de Pear said that the station called in security specialists in response to social media abuse and threats directed against her. Newman later said that "there were literally thousands of abusive tweets – it was a semi-organised campaign. It ranged from the usual 'cunt, bitch, dumb blonde' to 'I'm going to find out where you live and execute you'." On Twitter, Peterson said "There is no doubt that Cathy has been subjected to a withering barrage of criticism online. One of the things I've been trying to do is to try to imagine what I'd do if I found myself in her situation and how I would react to it and understand how it was happening. But they've provided no evidence that the criticisms constituted threats. There are some nasty cracks online but the idea that this is somehow reflective of a fundamental misogyny and that's what's driving this is ridiculous", although Peterson called for his supporters to be more civil. Following the interview, Newman's Wikipedia article was "rapidly edited back and forth" for several weeks. Newman said that women generally are misrepresented in their Wikipedia biographies because the "internet is being written by men with an agenda."

==== Conor Burns: "Ambushed with a cake" ====
On 25 January 2022, Newman interviewed Conor Burns, minister of state for Northern Ireland, on Channel 4 News about the imminent publication of Sue Gray's report into alleged parties at 10 Downing Street in violation of COVID-19 lockdowns. Burns defended Prime Minister Boris Johnson by insisting that one party to celebrate Johnson's birthday "was not a premeditated, organised party. He was, in a sense, ambushed with a cake". The interview quickly went viral, inspiring thousands of social media memes, and Burns was widely mocked. The food writer Nigella Lawson joked on Twitter that she intended to use the phrase as the title for her next book.

==== John Smyth QC abuse investigation ====
In 2017, Newman led a Channel 4 investigation into John Smyth, barrister and friend of the Archbishop of Canterbury, Justin Welby, revealing Smyth's decades of abuse of boys and young men. In response, the Church of England commissioned Keith Makin, a former director of social services, to conduct an official, independent review. Seven years later, in 2024, Newman received a leaked copy of the Makin Report and subsequently interviewed Welby for Channel 4 News. Reacting to pressure from senior Church leaders, Welby quit as Archbishop of Canterbury five days later. On 13 January 2025, Newman was awarded "Woman of the Year" by the Women in Journalism UK for her investigations into and reports on the John Smyth abuse case which spanned several years. Also in January 2025, Newman revealed that the Bishop of Liverpool, John Perumbalath, had been accused of sexually harassing a female Bishop and sexually assaulting another woman; allegations he denied. He resigned days later.

In March 2025, at the Royal Television Society Journalism Awards, Newman won Network Interview of the Year and Network Television Journalist of the Year. In November 2025, at the Foreign Press Association Media Awards, she won TV News Story of the Year for her interview with Welby. Also in November 2025, at the Society of Editors Awards, she won Broadcast Journalist of the Year. In December 2025, at the British Journalism Awards, she won Journalist of the Year and Interviewer of the Year.

==== Lucy Beaumont ====
In the wake of the ITN and Guardian allegations that David Walliams had abused his celebrity status to groom young fans - allegations he denies - comedian Lucy Beaumont appeared on The Cathy Newman Show to reveal that she offered to pay an alleged victim's legal fees and claimed one had signed an NDA which prevented her discussing the allegations with her family, friends or even a therapist. In the interview Beaumont also revealed she was taken off by an older man in the TV industry at a BBC awards party when she was just 16. Beaumont remarked in the Sky interview that she believed she would not ever work in TV again after speaking out about Walliams. The interview subsequently went viral and fans of Beaumont rallied round her, sending sales of her book and tour tickets soaring.

=== Times Radio ===
In April 2020, ahead of the launch of the national radio station Times Radio, Newman was announced as the presenter of the station’s Friday drivetime programme. The programme forms part of the station’s core weekday schedule and has featured news, political interviews and discussion of major national events, with Newman continuing her television role at Channel 4 News alongside her Times Radio presenting duties.

Newman has remained a regular presenter on the station beyond its launch period, continuing to host the Friday drivetime slot in subsequent years. Commentators have highlighted her role on the programme in covering major political and public-life developments; for example, a 2025 review in the Church Times noted Newman presenting Drive during live reporting on the appointment of the next Archbishop of Canterbury.

=== Sky News ===
On 14 January 2026, it was announced that Newman would leave Channel 4 News after two decades to join Sky News as a senior political presenter and journalist. She was appointed to front Sky News' flagship daily 7pm politics programme, as well as launch a new podcast and work on long-form investigations and documentaries. She joined the newsroom in April 2026, with further programme details to be confirmed at a later date. On November 12, 2026, Newman launched a new Sky News podcast series called Backstory, interviewing guests who were at the heart of some of the most defining stories of recent history. The first series featured playwright and Sherwood creator James Graham, discussing the impact of the Miners Strikes; Jo Hamilton, subpostmaster, campaigner and victim of the Post Office scandal; Dame Jenny Harries, the former Deputy Chief Medical Officer for England who became a familiar face at the government's COVID lockdown briefings; Kate Adie, the veteran journalist and broadcaster discussing Tiananmen Square; Don McCullin, legendary war photographer, revisiting the Vietnam War; and Zelda Perkins, former personal assistant to Harvey Weinstein, on the MeToo movement.

== Other works ==
=== Writing ===
Newman's book, Bloody Brilliant Women, concerning significant, but unheralded, 20th-century women, was published in 2018. The book presents case studies of both prominent and lesser known women throughout British history, finding parallels between their experiences and those of contemporary women. In 2019, Humanists UK awarded Newman with its Rosalind Franklin Medal in recognition of the book and her other investigative journalism work.

== Personal life ==
In 2001 Newman married writer John O'Connell, whom she had met at Oxford University. The couple live in Herne Hill, south-east London and have two daughters. Newman has written about having a miscarriage, and about deciding to have an abortion, after discovering 13 weeks into her pregnancy that the foetus had a rare condition with a high mortality rate.

== Publications ==
- Bloody Brilliant Women. William Collins. 2018. ISBN 978-0-00-824171-1.
- It Takes Two. William Collins, 2020. ISBN 978-0-00-836333-8.
- The Ladder. William Collins, 2024. ISBN 978-0-00-856746-0
