= Scripture Union =

International Christian Parachurch NGO

- Founded: 1867
- Founder: Josiah Spiers
- Type: Charitable
- Purpose: Christianity, young people
- Location: Didcot, England, United Kingdom
- Origins: UK
- Region served: Global; (Over 130 movements in 120 countries)
- Product: Bible reading materials, camps, missions
- Website: Scripture Union International Website

Scripture Union (SU) is an international, interdenominational, evangelical Christian organisation. It was founded in 1867, and works in partnership with individuals and churches across the world. The organisation's stated aim is to use the Bible to inspire children, young people and adults to know God.

Scripture Union is an autonomous organisation in each country, linked together by Scripture Union International. It is primarily a volunteer organisation with a small number of full-time staff training, encouraging and coordinating ministry workers around the world. Scripture Union is also a member of the Forum of Bible Agencies International.

== Origin ==
In 1867 Josiah Spiers spoke to 15 children in a drawing room in Islington, London, and began the work of sharing the Christian message with children in a way that related to their real needs. This led to the founding of the Children's Special Service Mission (CSSM) which was later to become "Scripture Union".

At about the same time as Spiers held his meeting in Islington, brothers Samuel and James Tyler and Tom Bond Bishop started a similar meeting in Blackfriars Road, south of the river Thames. Similarly, Henry Hankinson and Henry Hutchinson had started meetings in Mildmay Park; all were influenced by Rev Edward Payson Hammond, a controversial American preacher who had visited London in the early summer of 1867 and held meetings for both children and Sunday School teachers.

The following year, Spiers travelled to Llandudno on holiday and began to tell the children there about his faith. He drew the text "God is Love" in the sand, invited children to decorate it, and then told them a Bible story.

Spiers quickly established the CSSM as a mission to oversee his work in Islington. By August 1868 Bishop had joined the committee and by the end of the year, Hankinson was also a member, bringing in the Mildmay Park meetings as well. Whilst Spiers was the engaging children's speaker, Bishop had the organising ability and became the honorary secretary. The working partnership of Bond and Spiers was to last for more than 40 years and be the foundation of the modern Scripture Union.

In 1879, CSSM started the Children's Scripture Union, a system of daily Bible reading. A membership card had a list of daily readings, and this was soon complemented by explanatory notes in children's magazines. Booklets of notes were published for troops in the trenches during the First World War and led to the first issue of Daily Notes in 1923.

In 1892, the first Boys' Camp was started in Littlehampton by Major Liebenrood, a veteran from the Anglo-Zulu War. The following year, the Caravan Mission to Village Children (CMVC) was started using a bakers' cart. The CMVC became part of CSSM, but in 1960 Scripture Union became the official name of the organisation.

In the 1950s, CSSM/Scripture Union held an annual book writing competition, resulting in the publication of many children's novels, including several by Patricia St. John, such as Treasures of the Snow, still in print today. These were hardback books with illustrations and dust jackets by artist L. F. Lupton.

In 1961, the name of the organisation was changed from “The Children’s Special Service Mission” to Scripture Union”.

Scripture Union's work is carried out through local people in ways which are seen as appropriate to each country, culture and situation in which a movement is based. This can include running camps, and missions (e.g. holiday beach mission), working in schools and with student groups or producing resources for Bible reading, family counselling, AIDS education, urban children and youth ministry and ministry to the 'disabled'.

In Britain, Scripture Union has been criticised by an independent review for its links with the Iwerne camps, where students from leading public schools are said to have been groomed for sexual abuse during the 1970s and 1980s. Though the review found that the camps were not in practice run by Scripture Union, but by the Iwerne Trust, the SU employed three of the staff at Iwerne and supported its operations. The camp leader, John Smyth QC, who was also an SU trustee, befriended youths and abused them.

In 2017, Scripture Union was active in over 120 countries.

== See also ==
- List of Scripture Union movements
- Abide Weekend
- Awana
- International Fellowship of Evangelical Students
- E. J. H. Nash
- Titus Trust
