= David Sheppard =

English cleric and cricketer (1929–2005)

The Right Reverend and Right Honourable David Sheppard
- Sheppard in 1969
- Born: David Stuart Sheppard; 6 March 1929; Reigate, Surrey, England
- Died: 5 March 2005 (aged 75); West Kirby, Merseyside, England
- Spouse: Grace Isaac
- Children: Jenny Sinclair
- Bishop of Liverpool
- Church: Church of England
- Diocese: Diocese of Liverpool
- Installed: 1975
- Term ended: 1997 (retired)
- Predecessor: Stuart Blanch
- Successor: James Jones
- Other posts: Labour life peer 1998–2005; Bishop of Woolwich 1969–1975

Orders
- Ordination: 29 September 1955 (deacon); 29 September 1956 (priest) by William Wand (deacon); Henry Montgomery Campbell (priest)
- Consecration: 18 October 1969 by Michael Ramsey

Personal details
- Occupation: Cricketer

Member of the House of Lords
- Lord Temporal
- Life peerage 14 February 1998 – 5 March 2005
- Lord Spiritual
- Bishop of Liverpool; 3 December 1980 – 18 October 1997
- Cricket career

Cricket information
- Batting: Right-handed
- Bowling: Slow left arm orthodox

International information
- National side: England
- Test debut (cap 353): 12 August 1950 v West Indies
- Last Test: 19 March 1963 v New Zealand

Domestic team information
- Years: Team
- 1947–1962: Sussex
- 1950–1952: Cambridge University

Career statistics
Competition	Test	FC
Matches	22	230
Runs scored	1,172	15,838
Batting average	37.80	43.51
100s/50s	3/6	45/75
Top score	119	239*
Balls bowled	–	120
Wickets	–	2
Bowling average	–	44.00
5 wickets in innings	–	0
10 wickets in match	–	0
Best bowling	–	1/5
Catches/stumpings	12/–	194/–
- Source: Cricinfo

David Stuart Sheppard, Baron Sheppard of Liverpool (6 March 1929 – 5 March 2005) was a Church of England bishop who played cricket for Sussex and England in his youth, before serving as Bishop of Liverpool from 1975 to 1997. Sheppard remains the only ordained minister to have played Test cricket, though others such as Tom Killick were ordained after playing Tests.

== Early life ==
Sheppard was born in Reigate and brought up in Charlwood, Surrey. His father was a solicitor, and a cousin of Tubby Clayton, founder of Toc H; his mother was the daughter of the artist and illustrator William James Affleck Shepherd. His family moved to Sussex after his father died in the late 1930s.

Sheppard was educated at Northcliffe House School in Bognor Regis and then at Sherborne School, Dorset, where his cricketing talent first emerged. After National Service as a second lieutenant in the Royal Sussex Regiment, he went to study history at Trinity Hall, Cambridge, in 1949, and started to play first-class cricket. He obtained a 2:2 in both parts of the history tripos.

== Cricketing career ==
Sheppard played cricket for Cambridge University (blue 1950, 1951 and 1952; captain 1952), Sussex (captain 1953) and England. He made his Test debut against West Indies in August 1950, having scored heavily for Cambridge against the tourists earlier that summer. He toured Australia as an undergraduate with Freddie Brown in 1950–51 without success.

In 1952 Sheppard topped the English batting averages, scoring 2,262 runs at an average of 64.62, including a record 1,531 runs and 7 centuries for Cambridge University. His career total for Cambridge University, 3,545, was also a record. He hit 1,000 runs in a season six times, reaching 2,000 three times (highest 2,270, average 45.40, in 1953). He hit three double centuries, one for Sussex and two for Cambridge University (highest 239 not out for Cambridge University v Worcestershire at Worcester in 1952). He reached his highest Test score, 119, against India at the Oval in 1952.

Sussex were the runners-up in the County Championship in 1953, and Sheppard was one of the Wisden Cricketers of the Year that year. In 1954 he captained England in two Tests against Pakistan in the absence of Len Hutton. He won one Test and drew the other, but the series ended in a 1–1 draw. Sheppard was a favourite with the Old Guard at Lord's, who had wanted him to captain the tour of Australia in 1954–55 instead of the Yorkshire professional Hutton, but this came to naught. Sheppard was already progressing his clerical career and declined to tour unless required as a captain. In 1956 he was recalled to play Australia and made 113 in the Fourth Test at Old Trafford, where Jim Laker famously took 19 wickets and England won by an innings.

He was a staunch opponent of apartheid in South Africa, and one of many signatories in a letter to The Times on 17 July 1958 opposing 'the policy of apartheid' in international sport and defending 'the principle of racial equality which is embodied in the Declaration of the Olympic Games'. He refused to play against the touring South Africans in 1960, refused to watch the touring South Africans in 1965 and was a vocal opponent of the proposed MCC tour in 1968–69 which was ultimately cancelled after the South African government refused to allow Basil D'Oliveira to play. In 1970 he supported the Fair Cricket Campaign against the proposed 1970 tour of England by South African cricket team.

On top of all this we were besieged by clergymen eager to meet the Reverend David Sheppard ... In no time at all the news in the press concerning the England team centred on ... where David Sheppard was sermonizing.

Fred Trueman

Sheppard was willing to take a sabbatical from his church mission in the East End in order to tour Australia in 1962–63. His many friends at Lord's wanted him to captain the Fourth and Fifth Tests against Pakistan in 1962, but Sheppard had not played serious cricket for years. He made 112 for the Gentlemen and was chosen for the tour, but Ted Dexter was confirmed as captain for the remainder of the home series and the forthcoming tour of Australia. Sheppard agreed to tour and "the presence in the pulpit of David Sheppard...filled the Anglican cathedral of every state capital from Perth to Brisbane" Sheppard made 0 and 113 in the victorious Second Test at Melbourne, but dropped two catches and was dropped himself when he was on a pair in the second innings. He ran out his captain Ted Dexter, took a risky single for the winning run and was run out by Bill Lawry so that Ken Barrington had to come out to see Colin Cowdrey make the winning single. Although he held some good catches on the tour "the ones I dropped were at such vital moments", Richie Benaud and Bill Lawry in the Second Test and Neil Harvey in the Fourth Test off Trueman, who told him "The only time your hands are together are on Sunday". This is a story that increased with the telling, another version being "Pretend it's Sunday Reverend, and keep your hands together", or that it was Sheppard who said "Sorry Fred, I should have kept my hands together". One couple in Australia asked Mrs Sheppard if the Reverend could christen their baby, but she advised them not to as he was bound to drop it.

Sheppard played his last Tests against New Zealand in early 1963.

== Ecclesiastical career ==
Sheppard was converted to evangelical Christianity whilst at Cambridge, influenced by Donald Grey Barnhouse, and trained for the ministry at Ridley Hall, Cambridge from 1953 to 1955, where he attended the lectures of Owen Chadwick and Maurice Wiles, and was much impressed by a visiting lecturer, Donald Soper. He was involved with the Iwerne camps ministry of E. J. H. Nash. He was ordained in 1955, serving his title as curate at St Mary's Church, Islington, but continued to play Test cricket sporadically until 1963, being the first ordained minister to do so. From 1957, he was warden of the Mayflower Family Centre in Canning Town.

Sheppard became Bishop of Woolwich (a suffragan bishop in the Diocese of Southwark) in 1969, and Bishop of Liverpool in 1975. When installed as Bishop of Liverpool, he was the youngest diocesan bishop in England. He was an active broadcaster and campaigner, especially on the subjects of poverty and social reform in the inner cities, and opposition to apartheid and the tour to England by the South African cricket team scheduled to take place in 1970.

Sheppard worked closely with the Roman Catholic Archbishop of Liverpool, Derek Worlock, on these issues, and was often an outspoken critic of Margaret Thatcher's government. The Queen visited both Liverpool cathedrals in 1978 to celebrate the long-delayed completion of the Anglican cathedral, and Pope John Paul II visited both cathedrals during his tour of England in 1982. The bishops worked together in the aftermath of the 1981 Toxteth riots, the 1985 Heysel stadium disaster and the 1989 Hillsborough Stadium disaster. Sheppard also worked with other church leaders in Liverpool, including the Methodist chairman John Newton. He gave the Dimbleby Lecture in 1984, on "The Other Britain". In 1985 he was appointed as a member of the Archbishop of Canterbury's Commission on Urban Priority Areas, culminating in the publishing of the controversial report "Faith in the City". He was national president of Family Service Units from 1987 and chaired the religious advisory committee for the BBC and IBA from 1989 to 1993.

Sheppard retired in 1997, and in the 1998 New Year Honours was elevated to a life peerage, taking the title Baron Sheppard of Liverpool, of West Kirby in the County of Merseyside. He sat in the House of Lords on the Labour benches.

== Awards and tributes ==
- He was the subject of This Is Your Life in 1960 when he was surprised by Eamonn Andrews at the Islington Boys' Club.
- In 2001 Sheppard was named President of Sussex County Cricket Club.

== Writing ==
Beginning in the mid-1950s, Sheppard wrote a weekly column for Woman's Own, 520 words a week, "trying to make one point that had something to say about the everyday God in an accessible way". His column continued for 17 years. He wrote several books: Built As a City in 1974 about urban mission, Bias to the Poor in 1983, and two autobiographies, Parson's Pitch in 1964 and Steps Along Hope Street in 2002 (named after the street in Liverpool which links the Anglican and Roman Catholic cathedrals).

== Personal life ==
In 1957 Sheppard married Grace Isaac, a daughter of a clergyman, whom he had met at Cambridge. Their only child, Jenny (now Sinclair), was born in 1962. Jenny was the founder director of Together for the Common Good, a charity which supports collaborative work in the fields of religious understanding and community capacity building.

In December 2003, Sheppard announced that he had been suffering from colorectal cancer for the previous two years. He died on 5 March 2005, the day before what would have been his 76th birthday. He was survived by his wife and daughter. After a funeral near his retirement home at West Kirby on the Wirral, his ashes were buried in Liverpool Cathedral, with a memorial service at the cathedral in May 2005. Lady Sheppard died of cancer on 10 November 2010, aged 75.

== Legacy ==
On Whit Sunday, 11 May 2008, during the Christian Walk of Witness, a memorial statue, the Sheppard-Worlock Statue in the form of two bronze doors, was unveiled to honour both Sheppard and Archbishop Derek Worlock. The memorial was designed by notable sculptor Stephen Broadbent and funded by public donations. The memorial is situated halfway down Hope Street, in sight of the Anglican and Catholic cathedrals in Liverpool.

The official biography of Bishop Sheppard by Andrew Bradstock of the University of Winchester, entitled Batting for the Poor, was published by SPCK on 21 November 2019.

== Bibliography ==
=== by David Sheppard ===
- Parson's Pitch (1964) - autobiography. Published by Hodder & Stoughton
- Built As a City (1974) Published by Hodder & Stoughton
- Bias to the Poor (1983). Published by Hodder & Stoughton
- With Christ in the Wilderness: Following Lent Together (1990), written with Derek Worlock. Published by Barnabas
- Steps Along Hope Street: My Life in Cricket, the Church and the Inner City (2002) - autobiography. Published by Hodder & Stoughton

=== by other authors ===
- Bradstock, Andrew. Batting for the Poor: The Authorized Biography of David Sheppard. London: SPCK Publishing, 2019 ISBN 9780281081059.
- Brown, Geoff and Hogsbjerg, Christian. Apartheid is not a Game: Remembering the Stop the Seventy Tour campaign. London: Redwords, 2020 ISBN 9781912926589.

Religious titles
Preceded by John Robinson	Bishop of Woolwich; 1969–1975	Succeeded by Michael Marshall
Preceded by Stuart Blanch	Bishop of Liverpool; 1975–1997	Succeeded by James Jones
Sporting positions
Preceded by James Langridge	Sussex county cricket captain 1953	Succeeded by Hubert Doggart
Preceded by Len Hutton	England cricket captain 1954	Succeeded by Len Hutton
