= Iwerne Minster =

Village in Dorset, England

Coordinates: 50.9284°N 2.1906°W

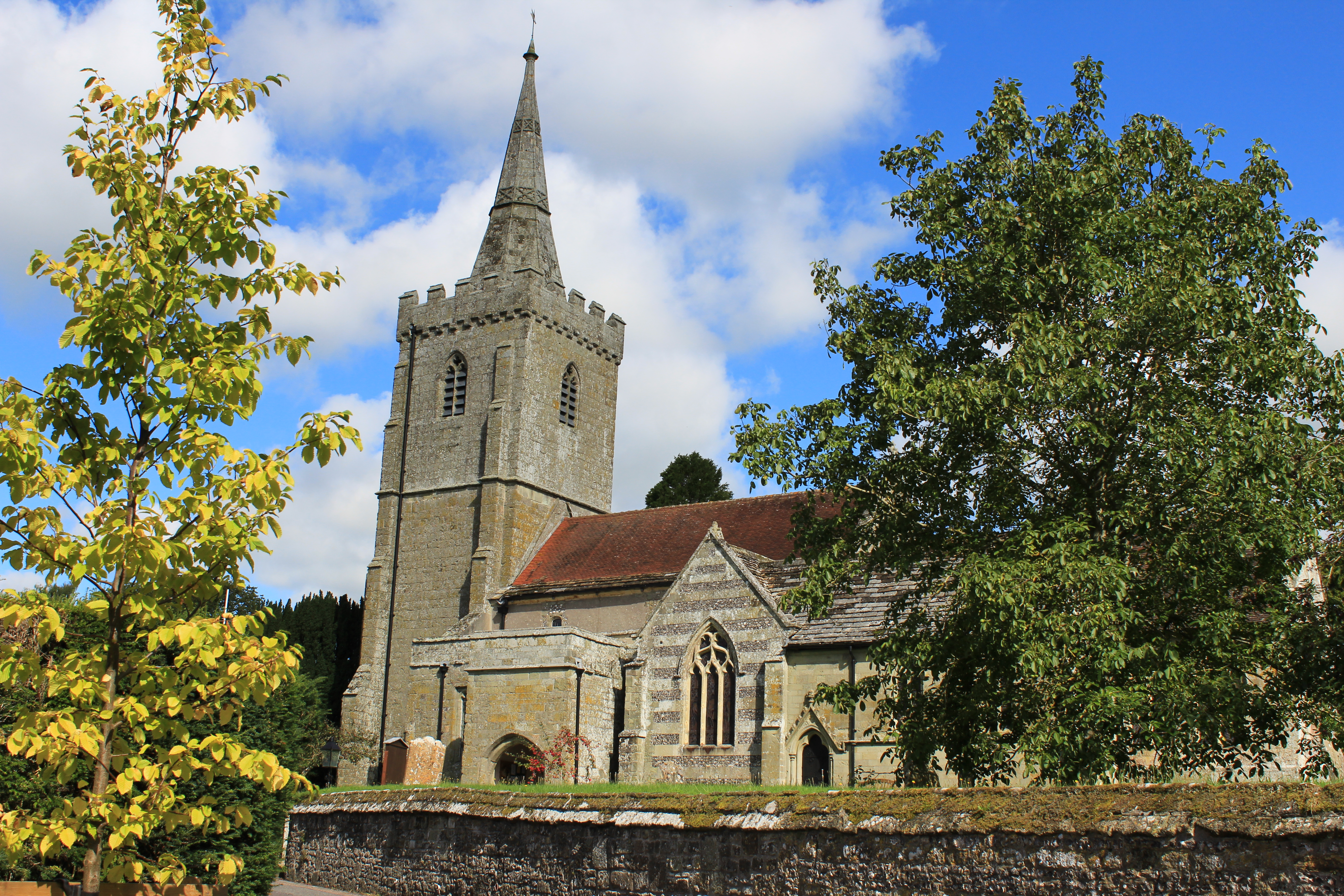
- Parish Church of St Mary

- Location within Dorset
- Population: 978 (2011)
- OS grid reference: ST865143
- Civil parish: Iwerne Minster
- Unitary authority: Dorset
- Ceremonial county: Dorset
- Region: South West
- Country: England
- Sovereign state: United Kingdom
- Post town: Blandford Forum
- Postcode district: DT11
- Dialling code: 01747
- Police: Dorset
- Fire: Dorset and Wiltshire
- Ambulance: South Western
- UK Parliament: North Dorset

Iwerne Minster (/ˈjuːɜːrn/ YOO-ern) is a village and civil parish in Dorset, England. It lies on the edge of the Blackmore Vale, approximately midway between the towns of Shaftesbury and Blandford Forum. The A350 main road between those towns passes through the edge of the village, just to the west. In the 2011 Census the civil parish had a population of 978.

== Toponymy ==
The village takes its name from the River Iwerne. "Iwerne" may have been the name of a Celtic goddess or may be a reference to yew trees growing on its banks. The "Minster" part of the name is a reference to the ownership of the settlement by Shaftesbury Abbey.

== History ==
Evidence of prehistoric human activity in the parish consists of five round barrows on the chalk escarpment in the east, and the site of an Iron Age settlement in the southwest, near Park Farm. The settlement, which takes the form of several pits, was excavated by General Pitt-Rivers in 1897; finds included a bronze brooch and silver coins.

In the early Roman period the Iron Age site was altered with the construction of ditches and sub-rectangular pits; finds included 1st and 2nd-century samian pottery and Roman coins dating from the period between Vespasian and Commodus. In the 3rd century a building, possibly an aisled barn, was constructed on the western half of the site; it was 34 metres (112 feet) long, 12 m (39 ft) wide and had flint footings 90 cm (3 ft) wide. More Roman coins were found here, dating from the period between Gordian I and Tacitus. Around 300 AD a substantial building was constructed on the eastern half of the site; it was 38.3 m (125 ft 8 in) long and 5.5 m (18 ft 1 in) wide and divided into four rooms, with a granary built against one external wall and a corridor or outbuildings against another. One of the rooms had plaster walls and a floor made of shale from Kimmeridge. The building was occupied for about sixty years.

In the Domesday Book in 1086 the village was recorded as Euneministre (or Euneminstre). It was in Sixpenny Hundred and the lord and tenant-in-chief was Shaftesbury Abbey.

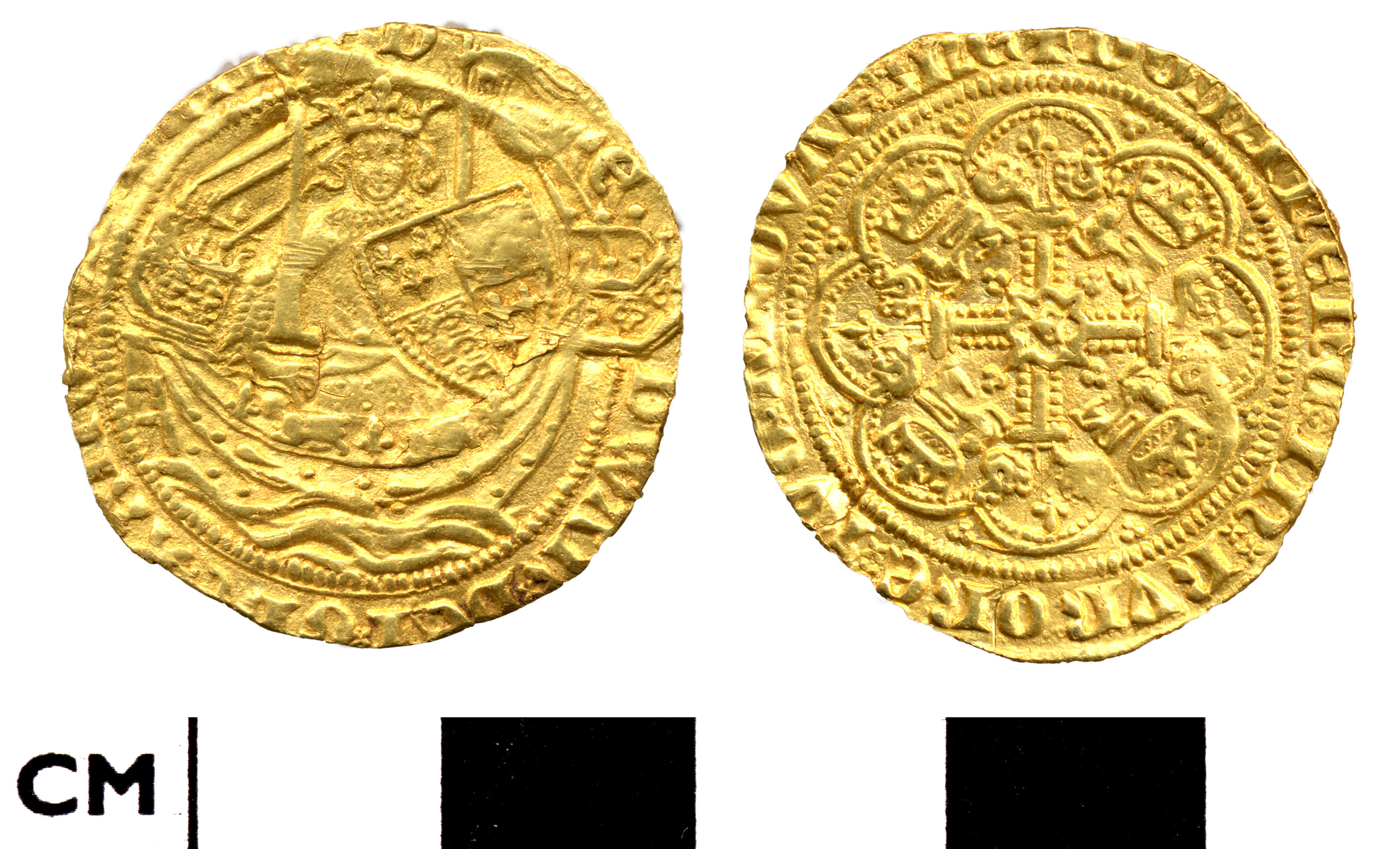
A gold half-noble coin of Edward III, dating to c. 1351, found in Iwerne Minster in 2011

The early settlements in the parish—Iwerne and Preston—were sited by the River Iwerne. There may have been a third settlement contemporary with these, called Hulle. Pegg's Farm in the northwest of the parish is probably a secondary settlement; it was in existence by the early 14th century, though the present buildings are mostly 18th-century.

The parish church, dedicated to St Mary, has a nave, north aisle and north transept dating from the mid-12th century, though it is probable there was a minster and clergy community here before that, as indicated by the village's name and its large size in the Domesday Book.

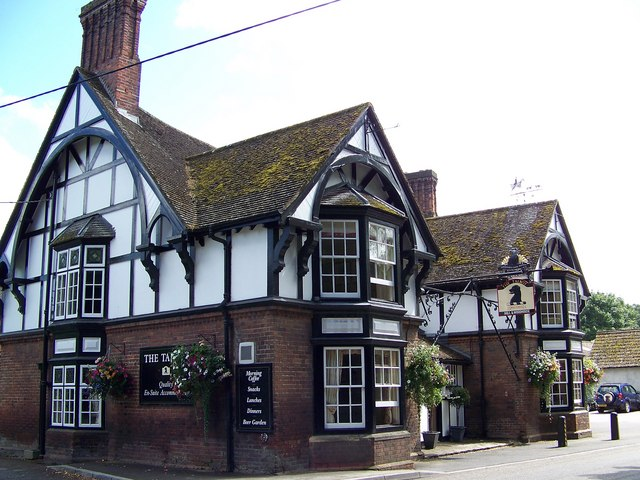
The Talbot Inn

Iwerne Minster House was built in 1796 by the Bowyer Bower family (who had owned the village and estate of Iwerne Minster since at least 1645), on the site of their original manor. Their family crest, the Talbot, is still represented in the name of the village pub. Iwerne Minster remained in the Bowyer Bower family until 1876, when they sold the estate to George Glyn, 2nd Baron Wolverton. Wolverton had a new house built, designed by Alfred Waterhouse and completed in 1878. A 150 acres (61 ha) ornamental park, including a lake, was also created. James Hainsworth Ismay, second son of Thomas Henry Ismay, bought the estate in 1908; he had a village hall, pump and shelter built, designed clothes for the village children and gave the village shops hand-painted signs, all resulting in the village having a "model" appearance. The estate was sold in 1929 and the mansion became Clayesmore School. From the 1940s until the 2000s, the school was the venue for the influential Evangelical Christian Iwerne camps.

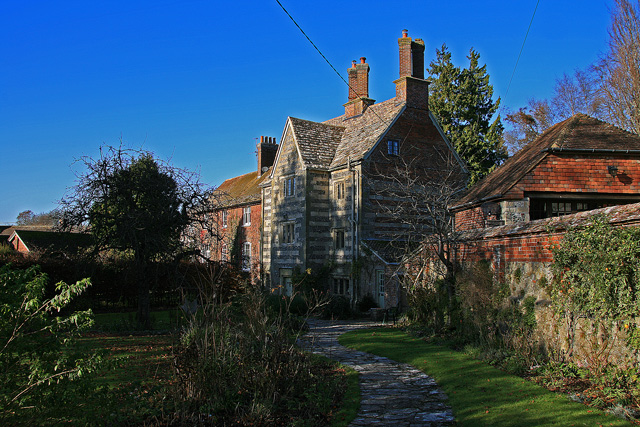
The Chantry, a Grade II* listed building

There are 44 structures in the parish that are listed by Historic England for having particular historical or architectural interest. These include the parish church of St Mary (Grade I) and The Chantry (Grade II*). The village noticeboard was designed by Giles Gilbert Scott.

== Geography ==
Iwerne Minster civil parish covers an area of 2,865 acres (1,159 hectares) at an elevation of about 52 to 190 m (171 to 623 ft). From east to west the geology of the parish comprises chalk hills in the east, then upper greensand and gault, through to lower greensand around the Fontmell Brook in the northwest. About half of the parish and most of Iwerne Minster village—the area east of the A350—is in the Cranborne Chase and West Wiltshire Downs Area of Outstanding Natural Beauty (AONB).

Measured directly, Iwerne Minster village is about 5 miles (8 kilometres) north of Blandford Forum and 5 mi (8 km) south of Shaftesbury.

== Governance ==
Iwerne Minster is in the northern part of the electoral ward called the Beacon Ward, which extends to includes Sutton Waldron, Fontmell Magna, Ashmore, Melburry Abbas & Cann, Twyford, Hartgrove, Compton Abbas, Todber, Stour Row, Stour Provost, East Orchard Shroton. The ward falls within the North Dorset parliamentary constituency and in the 2011 Census had a population of 4,818.

== Demography ==
In the 2011 Census the civil parish had 326 dwellings, 298 households and a population of 978. 21.4% of residents were aged 65 or over (compared to 16.4% for England as a whole).

The population of the parish in the censuses between 1921 and 2001 is shown in the table below:

Census Population of Iwerne Minster Parish 1921—2001 (except 1941)
Census	1921	1931	1951	1961	1971	1981	1991	2001
Population	501	411	520	467	650	650	900	880
Source:Dorset County Council

== In literature ==
Virginia Woolf and her husband spent five days in Iwerne Minster in April 1926; she wrote to her friend Raymond Mortimer about how, even though the appropriation of images of rural England for patriotic purposes made her "almost ashamed of England being so English", she and her husband had nevertheless been enchanted by the Dorset landscape in spring. It is possible that the name of the fictional village Bolney Minster in Woolf's 1941 novel Between the Acts was partly inspired by Iwerne.

A pre-Norman conquest Iwerne Minster is imagined, along with neighbouring village Shroton, in Julian Rathbone's 1997 novel The Last English King.

== See also ==
- Lord Wolverton
- Talbot (dog)
