= Interstellar medium =

Matter and radiation in the space between the star systems in a galaxy

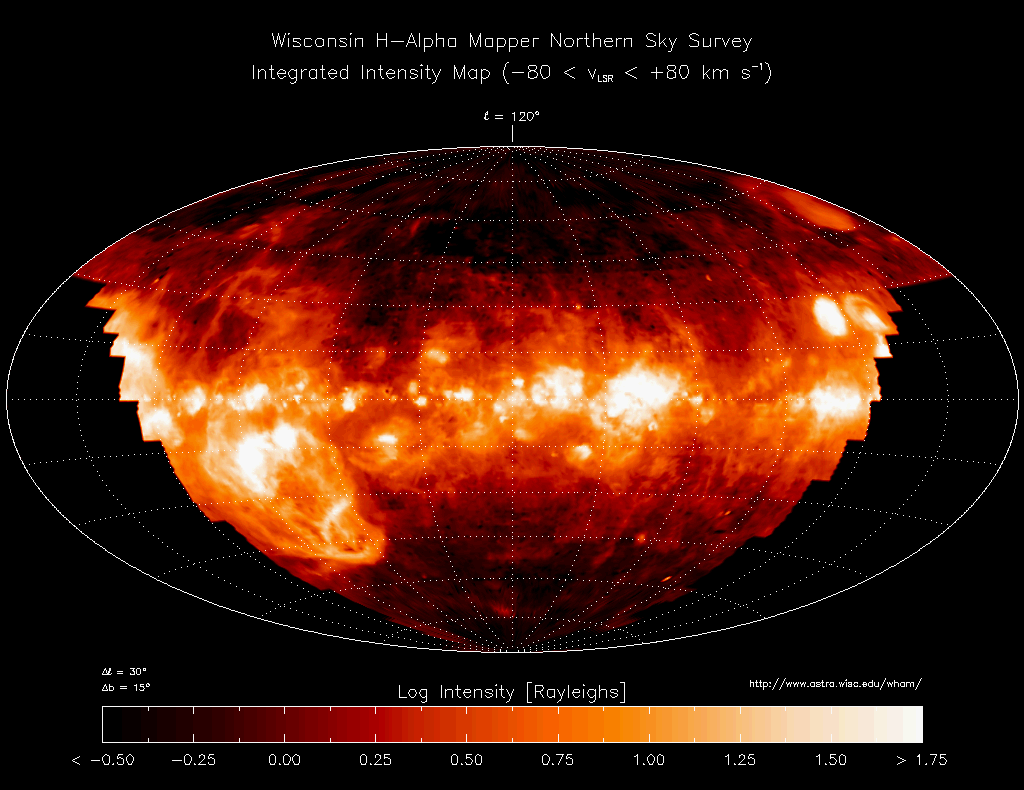
The distribution of ionized hydrogen (known by astronomers as H II from old spectroscopic terminology) in the parts of the Galactic interstellar medium visible from the Earth's northern hemisphere as observed with the Wisconsin Hα Mapper (Haffner et al. 2003).

The interstellar medium (ISM) is the matter and radiation that exists in the space between the star systems in a galaxy. This matter includes gas in ionic, atomic, and molecular form, as well as dust and cosmic rays. It fills interstellar space and blends smoothly into the surrounding intergalactic medium. The energy that occupies the same volume, in the form of electromagnetic radiation, is the interstellar radiation field. Although the density of atoms in the ISM is usually far below that in the best laboratory vacuums, the mean free path between collisions is short compared to typical interstellar lengths, so on these scales the ISM behaves as a gas (more precisely as a plasma, as it is at least slightly ionized) and not as a collection of non-interacting particles.

The interstellar medium is composed of multiple phases distinguished by whether matter is ionic, atomic, or molecular, and the temperature and density of the matter. The interstellar medium is composed primarily of hydrogen, followed by helium with trace amounts of carbon, oxygen, and nitrogen. The thermal pressures of these phases are in rough equilibrium with one another. Magnetic fields and turbulent motions also provide pressure in the ISM, and are typically more important, dynamically, than the thermal pressure. In the interstellar medium, matter is primarily in molecular form and reaches number densities of 10^{12} molecules per m^{3} (1 trillion molecules per m^{3}). In hot, diffuse regions, gas is highly ionized, and the density may be as low as 100 ions per m^{3}. Compare this with a number density of roughly 10^{25} molecules per m^{3} for air at sea level, and 10^{16} molecules per m^{3} (10 quadrillion molecules per m^{3}) for a laboratory high-vacuum chamber. Within our galaxy, by mass, 99% of the ISM is gas in any form, and 1% is dust.

Of the gas in the ISM, by number 91% of atoms are hydrogen and 8.9% are helium, with 0.1% being atoms of elements heavier than hydrogen or helium, known as "metals" in astronomical parlance. By mass this amounts to 70% hydrogen, 28% helium, and 1.5% heavier elements. The hydrogen and helium are primarily a result of primordial nucleosynthesis, while the heavier elements in the ISM are mostly a result of enrichment (due to stellar nucleosynthesis) in the process of stellar evolution.

The ISM plays a crucial role in astrophysics precisely because of its intermediate role between stellar and galactic scales. Stars form within the densest regions of the ISM, which ultimately contributes to molecular clouds and replenishes the ISM with matter and energy through planetary nebulae, stellar winds, and supernovae. This interplay between stars and the ISM helps determine the rate at which a galaxy depletes its gaseous content, and therefore its lifespan of active star formation. Voyager 1 reached the ISM on August 25, 2012, making it the first artificial object from Earth to do so. Interstellar plasma and dust will be studied until the estimated mission end date of 2036. Its twin, Voyager 2 entered the ISM on November 5, 2018.

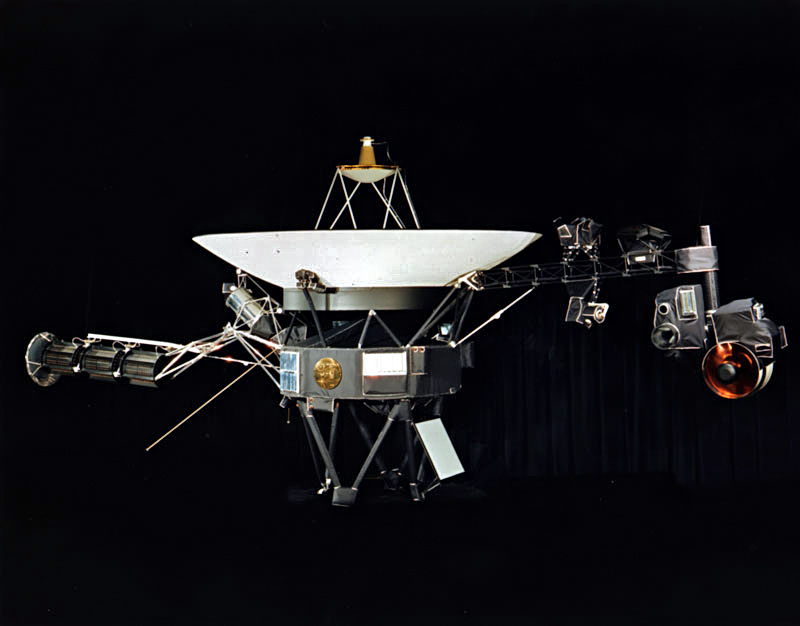
Voyager 1 is the first human made object to reach the interstellar medium.

== Interstellar matter ==
Table 1 shows a breakdown of the properties of the components of the ISM of the Milky Way.

Table 1: Components of the interstellar medium
| Component | Fractional volume | Scale height (pc) | Temperature (K) | Density (particles/cm^{3}) | State of hydrogen | Primary observational techniques |
|---|---|---|---|---|---|---|
| Molecular clouds | < 1% | 80 | 10–20 | 10^{2}–10^{6} | molecular | Radio and infrared molecular emission and absorption lines |
| Cold neutral medium (CNM) | 1–5% | 100–300 | 50–100 | 20–50 | neutral atomic | H I 21 cm line absorption |
| Warm neutral medium (WNM) | 10–20% | 300–400 | 6000–10000 | 0.2–0.5 | neutral atomic | H I 21 cm line emission |
| Warm ionized medium (WIM) | 20–50% | 1000 | 8000 | 0.2–0.5 | ionized | Hα emission and pulsar dispersion |
| H II regions | < 1% | 70 | 8000 | 10^{2}–10^{4} | ionized | Hα emission, pulsar dispersion, and radio recombination lines |
| Coronal gas Hot ionized medium (HIM) | 30–70% | 1000–3000 | 10^{6}–10^{7} | 10^{−4}–10^{−2} | ionized (metals also highly ionized) | X-ray emission; absorption lines of highly ionized metals, primarily in the ultraviolet |

=== The three-phase model ===
Field, Goldsmith & Habing (1969) put forward the static two phase equilibrium model to explain the observed properties of the ISM. Their modeled ISM included a cold dense phase (T < 300 K), consisting of clouds of neutral and molecular hydrogen, and a warm intercloud phase (T ~ 10^{4} K), consisting of rarefied neutral and ionized gas. McKee & Ostriker (1977) added a dynamic third phase that represented the very hot (T ~ 10^{6} K) gas that had been shock heated by supernovae and constituted most of the volume of the ISM. These phases are the temperatures where heating and cooling can reach a stable equilibrium. Their paper formed the basis for further study over the subsequent three decades. However, the relative proportions of the phases and their subdivisions are still not well understood.

The basic physics behind these phases can be understood through the behaviour of hydrogen, since this is by far the largest constituent of the ISM. The different phases are roughly in pressure balance over most of the Galactic disk, since regions of excess pressure will expand and cool, and likewise under-pressure regions will be compressed and heated. Therefore, since P = n k T, hot regions (high T) generally have low particle number density n. Coronal gas has low enough density that collisions between particles are rare and so little radiation is produced, hence there is little loss of energy and the temperature can stay high for periods of hundreds of millions of years. In contrast, once the temperature falls to O(10^{5} K) with correspondingly higher density, protons and electrons can recombine to form hydrogen atoms, emitting photons which take energy out of the gas, leading to runaway cooling. Left to itself this would produce the warm neutral medium. However, OB stars are so hot that some of their photons have energy greater than the Lyman limit, E > 13.6 eV, enough to ionize hydrogen. Such photons will be absorbed by, and ionize, any neutral hydrogen atom they encounter, setting up a dynamic equilibrium between ionization and recombination such that gas close enough to OB stars is almost entirely ionized, with temperature around 8000 K (unless already in the coronal phase), until the distance where all the ionizing photons are used up. This ionization front marks the boundary between the Warm ionized and Warm neutral medium.

OB stars, and also cooler ones, produce many more photons with energies below the Lyman limit, which pass through the ionized region almost unabsorbed. Some of these have high enough energy (> 11.3 eV) to ionize carbon atoms, creating a C II ("ionized carbon") region outside the (hydrogen) ionization front. In dense regions this may also be limited in size by the availability of photons, but often such photons can penetrate throughout the neutral phase and only get absorbed in the outer layers of molecular clouds. Photons with E > 4 eV or so can break up molecules such as H_{2} and CO, creating a photodissociation region (PDR) which is more or less equivalent to the Warm neutral medium. These processes contribute to the heating of the WNM. The distinction between Warm and Cold neutral medium is again due to a range of temperature/density in which runaway cooling occurs.

The densest molecular clouds have significantly higher pressure than the interstellar average, since they are bound together by their own gravity. When stars form in such clouds, especially OB stars, they convert the surrounding gas into the warm ionized phase, a temperature increase of several hundred. Initially the gas is still at molecular cloud densities, and so at vastly higher pressure than the ISM average: this is a classical H II region. The large overpressure causes the ionized gas to expand away from the remaining molecular gas (a Champagne flow), and the flow will continue until either the molecular cloud is fully evaporated or the OB stars reach the end of their lives, after a few millions years. At this point the OB stars explode as supernovas, creating blast waves in the warm gas that increase temperatures to the coronal phase (supernova remnants, SNR). These too expand and cool over several million years until they return to average ISM pressure.

=== The ISM in different kinds of galaxy ===
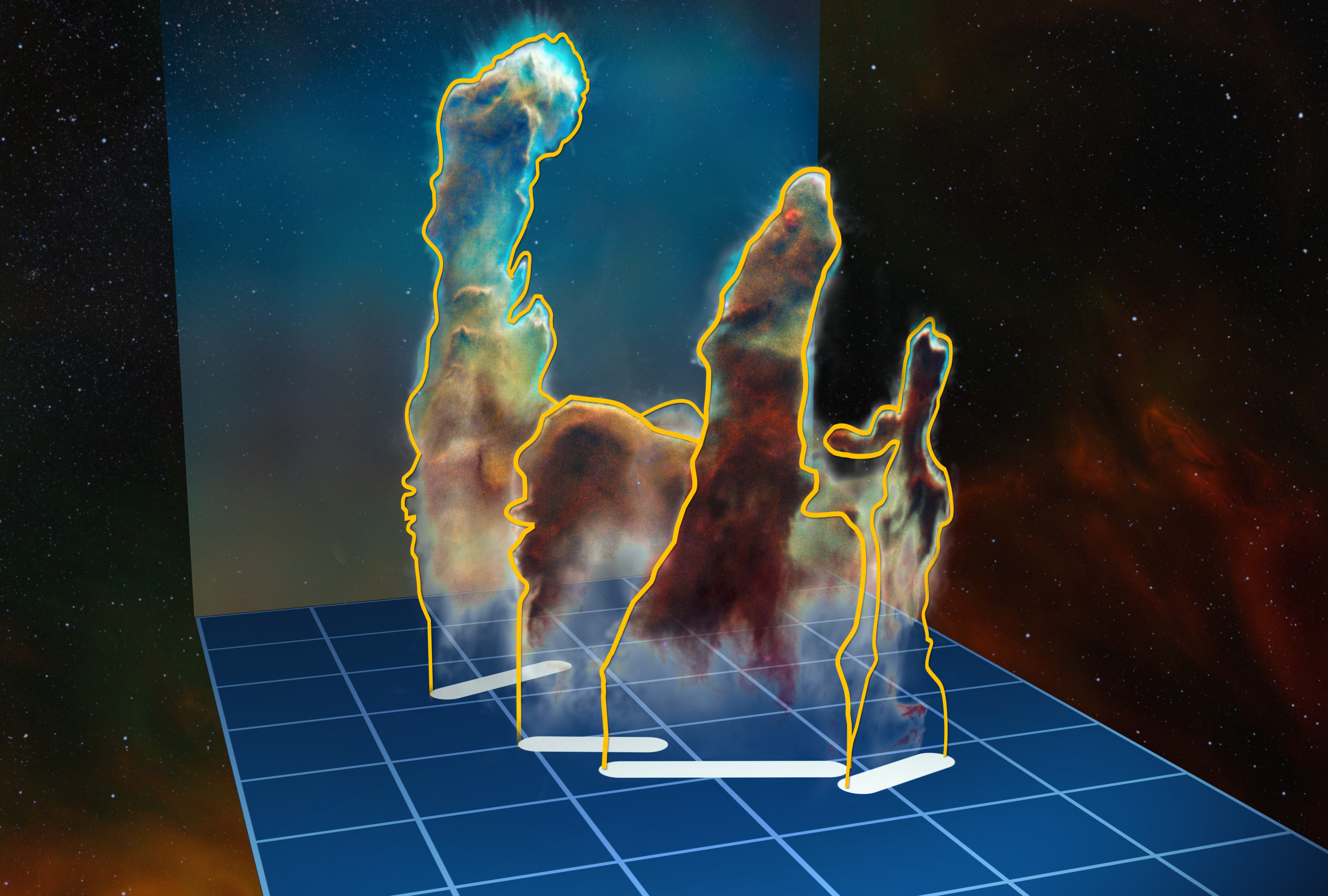
Three-dimensional structure in Pillars of Creation.

Most discussion of the ISM concerns spiral galaxies like the Milky Way, in which nearly all the mass in the ISM is confined to a relatively thin disk, typically with scale height about 100 parsecs (300 light years), which can be compared to a typical disk diameter of 30,000 parsecs. Gas and stars in the disk orbit the galactic centre with typical orbital speeds of 200 km/s. This is much faster than the random motions of atoms in the ISM, but since the orbital motion of the gas is coherent, the average motion does not directly affect structure in the ISM. The vertical scale height of the ISM is set in roughly the same way as the Earth's atmosphere, as a balance between the local gravitation field (dominated by the stars in the disk) and the pressure. Further from the disk plane, the ISM is mainly in the low-density warm and coronal phases, which extend at least several thousand parsecs away from the disk plane. This galactic halo or 'corona' also contains significant magnetic field and cosmic ray energy density.

The rotation of galaxy disks influences ISM structures in several ways. Since the angular velocity declines with increasing distance from the centre, any ISM feature, such as giant molecular clouds or magnetic field lines, that extend across a range of radius are sheared by differential rotation, and so tend to become stretched out in the tangential direction; this tendency is opposed by interstellar turbulence (see below) which tends to randomize the structures. Spiral arms are due to perturbations in the disk orbits - essentially ripples in the disk, that cause orbits to alternately converge and diverge, compressing and then expanding the local ISM. The visible spiral arms are the regions of maximum density, and the compression often triggers star formation in molecular clouds, leading to an abundance of H II regions along the arms. Coriolis force also influences large ISM features.

Irregular galaxies such as the Magellanic Clouds have similar interstellar mediums to spirals, but less organized. In elliptical galaxies the ISM is almost entirely in the coronal phase, since there is no coherent disk motion to support cold gas far from the center: instead, the scale height of the ISM must be comparable to the radius of the galaxy. This is consistent with the observation that there is little sign of current star formation in ellipticals. Some elliptical galaxies do show evidence for a small disk component, with ISM similar to spirals, buried close to their centers. The ISM of lenticular galaxies, as with their other properties, appear intermediate between spirals and ellipticals.

Very close to the center of most galaxies (within a few hundred light years at most), the ISM is profoundly modified by the central supermassive black hole: see Galactic Center for the Milky Way, and Active galactic nucleus for extreme examples in other galaxies. The rest of this article will focus on the ISM in the disk plane of spirals, far from the galactic center.

=== Structures ===
Map showing the Sun located near the edge of the Local Interstellar Cloud and Alpha Centauri about 4 light-years away in the neighboring G-Cloud complex

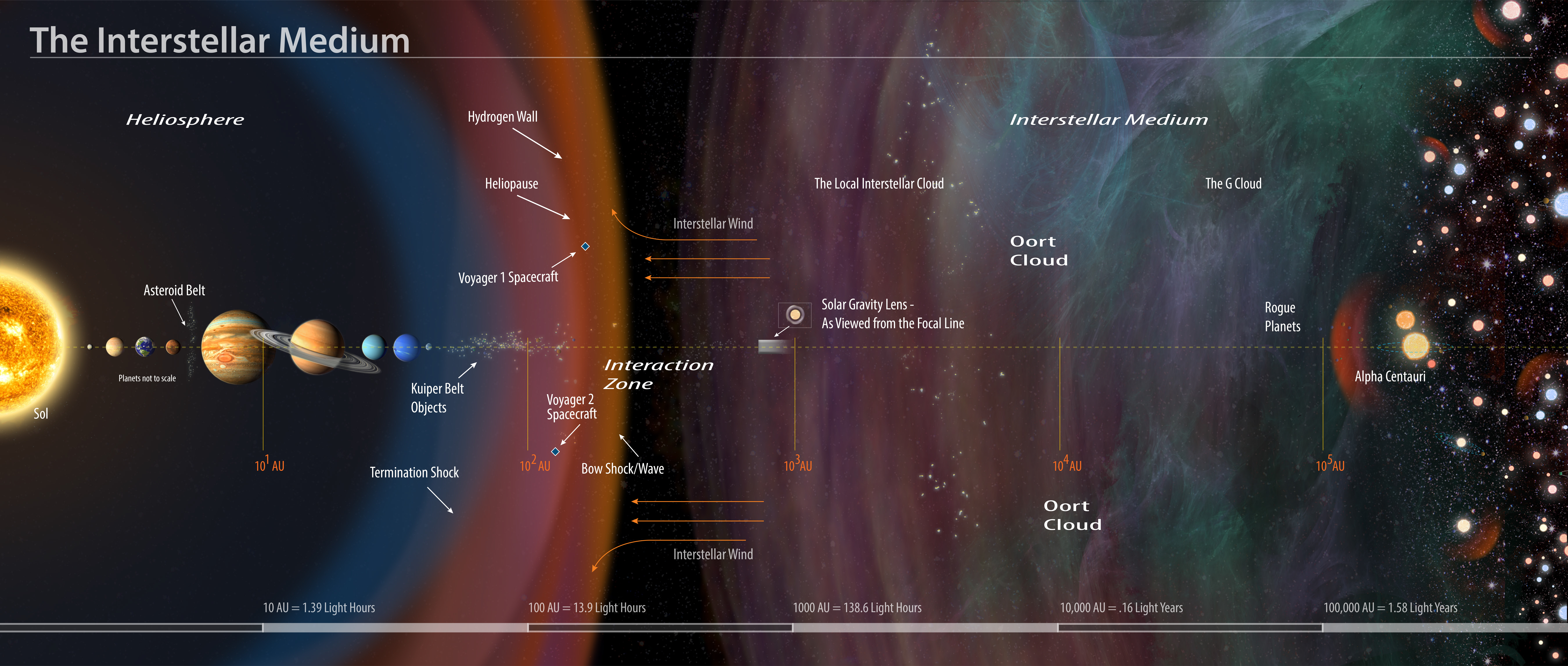
Interstellar medium and astrosphere meeting

Astronomers describe the ISM as turbulent, meaning that the gas has quasi-random motions coherent over a large range of spatial scales. Unlike normal turbulence, in which the fluid motions are highly subsonic, the bulk motions of the ISM are usually larger than the sound speed. Supersonic collisions between gas clouds cause shock waves which compress and heat the gas, increasing the sound speed so that the flow is locally subsonic; thus supersonic turbulence has been described as 'a box of shocklets', and is inevitably associated with complex density and temperature structure. In the ISM this is further complicated by the magnetic field, which provides wave modes such as Alfvén waves which are often faster than pure sound waves: if turbulent speeds are supersonic but below the Alfvén wave speed, the behaviour is more like subsonic turbulence.

Stars are born deep inside large complexes of molecular clouds, typically a few parsecs in size. During their lives and deaths, stars interact physically with the ISM.

Stellar winds from young clusters of stars (often with giant or supergiant HII regions surrounding them) and shock waves created by supernovae inject enormous amounts of energy into their surroundings, which leads to hypersonic turbulence. The resultant structures – of varying sizes – can be observed, such as stellar wind bubbles and superbubbles of hot gas, seen by X-ray satellite telescopes or turbulent flows observed in radio telescope maps.

Stars and planets, once formed, are unaffected by pressure forces in the ISM, and so do not take part in the turbulent motions, although stars formed in molecular clouds in a galactic disk share their general orbital motion around the galaxy center. Thus stars are usually in motion relative to their surrounding ISM. The Sun is currently traveling through the Local Interstellar Cloud, an irregular clump of the warm neutral medium a few parsecs across, within the low-density Local Bubble, a 100-parsec radius region of coronal gas.

In October 2020, astronomers reported a significant unexpected increase in density in the space beyond the Solar System as detected by the Voyager 1 and Voyager 2 space probes. According to the researchers, this implies that "the density gradient is a large-scale feature of the VLISM (very local interstellar medium) in the general direction of the heliospheric nose".

=== Interaction with interplanetary medium ===
The interstellar medium begins where the interplanetary medium of the Solar System ends. The solar wind slows to subsonic velocities at the termination shock, 90–100 astronomical units from the Sun. In the region beyond the termination shock, called the heliosheath, interstellar matter interacts with the solar wind. Voyager 1, the farthest human-made object from the Earth (after 1998), crossed the termination shock on December 16, 2004 and later entered interstellar space when it crossed the heliopause on August 25, 2012, providing the first direct probe of conditions in the ISM (Stone et al. 2005).

=== Interstellar extinction ===
Short, narrated video about IBEX's interstellar matter observations.

Dust grains in the ISM are responsible for extinction and reddening, the decreasing light intensity and shift in the dominant observable wavelengths of light from a star. These effects are caused by scattering and absorption of photons and allow the ISM to be observed with the naked eye in a dark sky. The apparent rifts that can be seen in the band of the Milky Way – a uniform disk of stars – are caused by absorption of background starlight by dust in molecular clouds within a few thousand light years from Earth. This effect decreases rapidly with increasing wavelength ("reddening" is caused by greater absorption of blue than red light), and becomes almost negligible at mid-infrared wavelengths (> 5 μm).

Extinction provides one of the best ways of mapping the three-dimensional structure of the ISM, especially since the advent of accurate distances to millions of stars from the Gaia mission. The total amount of dust in front of each star is determined from its reddening, and the dust is then located along the line of sight by comparing the dust column density in front of stars projected close together on the sky, but at different distances. By 2022 it was possible to generate a map of ISM structures within 3 kpc (10,000 light years) of the Sun.

Far ultraviolet light is absorbed effectively by the neutral hydrogen gas in the ISM. Specifically, atomic hydrogen absorbs very strongly at about 121.5 nanometers, the Lyman-alpha transition, and also at the other Lyman series lines. Therefore, it is nearly impossible to see light emitted at those wavelengths from a star farther than a few hundred light years from Earth, because most of it is absorbed during the trip to Earth by intervening neutral hydrogen. All photons with wavelength < 91.6 nm, the Lyman limit, can ionize hydrogen and are also very strongly absorbed. The absorption gradually decreases with increasing photon energy, and the ISM begins to become transparent again in soft X-rays, with wavelengths shorter than about 1 nm.

== Heating and cooling ==
The ISM is usually far from thermodynamic equilibrium. Collisions establish a Maxwell–Boltzmann distribution of velocities, and the 'temperature' normally used to describe interstellar gas is the 'kinetic temperature', which describes the temperature at which the particles would have the observed Maxwell–Boltzmann velocity distribution in thermodynamic equilibrium. However, the interstellar radiation field is typically much weaker than a medium in thermodynamic equilibrium; it is most often roughly that of an A star (surface temperature of ~10,000 K) highly diluted. Therefore, bound levels within an atom or molecule in the ISM are rarely populated according to the Boltzmann formula (Spitzer 1978, § 2.4).

Depending on the temperature, density, and ionization state of a portion of the ISM, different heating and cooling mechanisms determine the temperature of the gas.

=== Heating mechanisms ===
Heating by low-energy cosmic rays
The first mechanism proposed for heating the ISM was heating by low-energy cosmic rays. Cosmic rays are an efficient heating source able to penetrate in the depths of molecular clouds. Cosmic rays transfer energy to gas through both ionization and excitation and to free electrons through Coulomb interactions. Low-energy cosmic rays (a few MeV) are more important because they are far more numerous than high-energy cosmic rays.

Photoelectric heating by grains
The ultraviolet radiation emitted by hot stars can remove electrons from dust grains. The photon is absorbed by the dust grain, and some of its energy is used to overcome the potential energy barrier and remove the electron from the grain. This potential barrier is due to the binding energy of the electron (the work function) and the charge of the grain. The remainder of the photon's energy gives the ejected electron kinetic energy which heats the gas through collisions with other particles. A typical size distribution of dust grains is n(r) ∝ r^{−3.5}, where r is the radius of the dust particle. Assuming this, the projected grain surface area distribution is πr^{2}n(r) ∝ r^{−1.5}. This indicates that the smallest dust grains dominate this method of heating.
Photoionization
When an electron is freed from an atom (typically from absorption of a UV photon) it carries kinetic energy away of the order E_{photon} − E_{ionization}. This heating mechanism dominates in H II regions, but is negligible in the diffuse ISM due to the relative lack of neutral carbon atoms.
X-ray heating
X-rays remove electrons from atoms and ions, and those photoelectrons can provoke secondary ionizations. As the intensity is often low, this heating is only efficient in warm, less dense atomic medium (as the column density is small). For example, in molecular clouds only hard x-rays can penetrate and x-ray heating can be ignored. This is assuming the region is not near an x-ray source such as a supernova remnant.
Chemical heating
Molecular hydrogen (H_{2}) can be formed on the surface of dust grains when two H atoms (which can travel over the grain) meet. This process yields 4.48 eV of energy distributed over the rotational and vibrational modes, kinetic energy of the H_{2} molecule, as well as heating the dust grain. This kinetic energy, as well as the energy transferred from de-excitation of the hydrogen molecule through collisions, heats the gas.
Grain-gas heating
Collisions at high densities between gas atoms and molecules with dust grains can transfer thermal energy. This is not important in HII regions because UV radiation is more important. It is also less important in diffuse ionized medium due to the low density. In the neutral diffuse medium grains are always colder, but do not effectively cool the gas due to the low densities.

Grain heating by thermal exchange is very important in supernova remnants where densities and temperatures are very high.

Gas heating via grain-gas collisions is dominant deep in giant molecular clouds (especially at high densities). Far infrared radiation penetrates deeply due to the low optical depth. Dust grains are heated via this radiation and can transfer thermal energy during collisions with the gas. A measure of efficiency in the heating is given by the accommodation coefficient:
$$\alpha = \frac{T_2 - T}{T_d - T}$$
where T is the gas temperature, T_{d} the dust temperature, and T_{2} the post-collision temperature of the gas atom or molecule. This coefficient was measured by (Burke & Hollenbach 1983) as α = 0.35.

Other heating mechanisms
A variety of macroscopic heating mechanisms are present including:
- Gravitational collapse of a cloud
- Supernova explosions
- Stellar winds
- Expansion of H II regions
- Magnetohydrodynamic waves created by supernova remnants

=== Cooling mechanisms ===
Fine structure cooling
The process of fine structure cooling is dominant in most regions of the Interstellar Medium, except regions of hot gas and regions deep in molecular clouds. It occurs most efficiently with abundant atoms having fine structure levels close to the fundamental level such as: C II and O I in the neutral medium and O II, O III, N II, N III, Ne II and Ne III in H II regions. Collisions will excite these atoms to higher levels, and they will eventually de-excite through photon emission, which will carry the energy out of the region.

Cooling by permitted lines
At lower temperatures, more levels than fine structure levels can be populated via collisions. For example, collisional excitation of the n = 2 level of hydrogen will release a Ly-α photon upon de-excitation. In molecular clouds, excitation of rotational lines of CO is important. Once a molecule is excited, it eventually returns to a lower energy state, emitting a photon which can leave the region, cooling the cloud.

== Observations of the ISM ==
Despite its extremely low density, photons generated in the ISM are prominent in nearly all bands of the electromagnetic spectrum. In fact the optical band, on which astronomers relied until well into the 20th century, is the one in which the ISM is least obvious.

- Ionized gas radiates at a broad range of energies via bremsstrahlung. For gas in the warm phase (10^{4} K) this is mostly detected in microwaves, while bremsstrahlung from the million-kelvin coronal gas is prominent in soft X-rays. In addition, many spectral lines are produced, including the ones significant for cooling mentioned in the previous section. One of these, a forbidden line of doubly-ionized oxygen, gives many nebulae their apparent green colour in visual observations, and was once thought to be a new element, nebulium. Spectral lines from highly excited states of hydrogen are detectable at infra-red and longer wavelengths, down to radio recombination lines which, unlike optical lines, are not absorbed by dust and so can trace ionized regions throughout the disk of the Galaxy. Coronal gas emits a different set of lines, since atoms are stripped of a larger fraction of their electrons at its high temperature.
- The warm neutral medium produces most of the 21-cm line emission from hydrogen detected by radio telescopes, although atomic hydrogen in the cold neutral medium also contributes, both in emission and by absorption of photons from background warm gas ('H I self-absorption', HISA). While not important for cooling, the 21-cm line is easily observable at high spectral and angular resolution, giving us our most detailed view of the WNM.
- Molecular clouds are detected via spectral lines produced by changes in the rotational quantum state of small molecules, especially carbon monoxide, CO. The most widely used line is at 115 GHz, corresponding to the change from 1 to 0 quanta of angular momentum. Hundreds of other molecules have been detected, each with many lines, which allows physical and chemical processes in molecular clouds to be traced in some detail. These lines are most common at millimetre and sub-mm wavelengths. By far the most common molecule in molecular clouds, H_{2}, is usually not directly observable, as it stays in its ground state except when excited by rare events such as interstellar shock waves. There is some 'dark gas', regions where hydrogen is in molecular form and therefore does not emit the 21-cm line, but CO molecules are broken up so the CO lines are also not present. These regions are inferred from the presence of dust grains with no matching line emission from gas.
- Interstellar dust grains re-emit the energy they absorb from starlight as quasi-blackbody emission in the far infrared, corresponding to typical dust grain temperatures of 20–100 K. Very small grains, essentially fragments of graphene bonded to hydrogen atoms around their edges (polycyclic aromatic hydrocarbons, PAHs), emit numerous spectral lines in the mid-infrared, at wavelengths around 10 micron. Nanometre-sized grains can be spun up to rotate at GHz frequencies by a collision with a single ultraviolet photon, and dipole radiation from such spinning grains is believed to be the source of anomalous microwave emission.
- Cosmic rays generate gamma-ray photons when they collide with atomic nuclei in ISM clouds. The electrons amongst cosmic ray particles collide with a small fraction of photons in the interstellar radiation field and the cosmic microwave background and bump up the photon energies to X-rays and gamma-rays, via inverse Compton scattering. Due to the galactic magnetic field, charged particles follow spiral paths, and for cosmic-ray electrons this spiralling motion generates synchrotron radiation which is very bright at low radio frequencies.

== Radiowave propagation ==
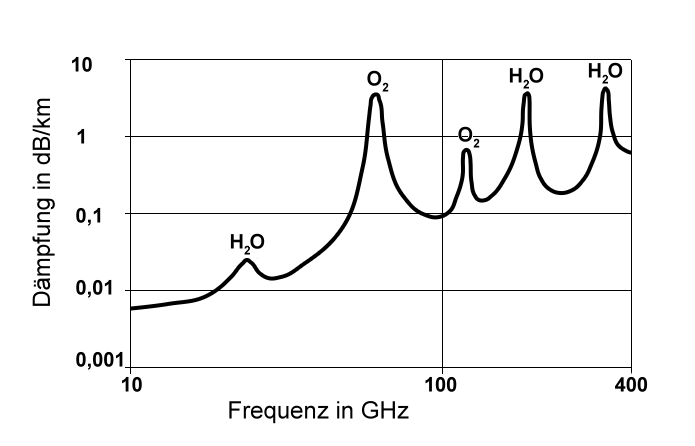
Atmospheric attenuation in dB/km as a function of frequency over the EHF band. Peaks in absorption at specific frequencies are a problem, due to atmosphere constituents such as water vapor (H_{2}O) and carbon dioxide (CO_{2}).

Radio waves are affected by the plasma properties of the ISM. The lowest frequency radio waves, below ≈ 0.1 MHz, cannot propagate through the ISM since they are below its plasma frequency. At higher frequencies, the plasma has a significant refractive index, decreasing with increasing frequency, and also dependent on the density of free electrons. Random variations in the electron density cause interstellar scintillation, which broadens the apparent size of distant radio sources seen through the ISM, with the broadening decreasing with frequency squared. The variation of refractive index with frequency causes the arrival times of pulses from pulsars and Fast radio bursts to be delayed at lower frequencies (dispersion). The amount of delay is proportional to the column density of free electrons (Dispersion measure, DM), which is useful for both mapping the distribution of ionized gas in the Galaxy and estimating distances to pulsars (more distant ones have larger DM).

A second propagation effect is Faraday rotation, which affects linearly polarized radio waves, such as those produced by synchrotron radiation, one of the most common sources of radio emission in astrophysics. Faraday rotation depends on both the electron density and the magnetic field strength, and so is used as a probe of the interstellar magnetic field.

The ISM is generally very transparent to radio waves, allowing unimpeded observations right through the disk of the Galaxy. There are a few exceptions to this rule. The most intense spectral lines in the radio spectrum can become opaque, so that only the surface of the line-emitting cloud is visible. This mainly affects the carbon monoxide lines at millimetre wavelengths that are used to trace molecular clouds, but the 21-cm line from neutral hydrogen can become opaque in the cold neutral medium. Such absorption only affects photons at the line frequencies: the clouds are otherwise transparent. The other significant absorption process occurs in dense ionized regions. These emit photons, including radio waves, via thermal bremsstrahlung. At short wavelengths, typically microwaves, these are quite transparent, but their brightness approaches the black body limit as $\propto \lambda^{2.1}$, and at wavelengths long enough that this limit is reached, they become opaque. Thus metre-wavelength observations show H II regions as cool spots blocking the bright background emission from Galactic synchrotron radiation, while at decametres the entire galactic plane is absorbed, and the longest radio waves observed, 1 km, can only propagate 10-50 parsecs through the Local Bubble. The frequency at which a particular nebula becomes optically thick depends on its emission measure
$$EM = \int n_e^2\, dl,$$
the column density of squared electron number density. Exceptionally dense nebulae can become optically thick at centimetre wavelengths: these are just-formed and so both rare and small ('Ultra-compact H II regions')

The general transparency of the ISM to radio waves, especially microwaves, may seem surprising since radio waves at frequencies > 10 GHz are significantly attenuated by Earth's atmosphere (as seen in the figure). But the column density through the atmosphere is vastly larger than the column through the entire Galaxy, due to the extremely low density of the ISM.

== History of knowledge of interstellar space ==
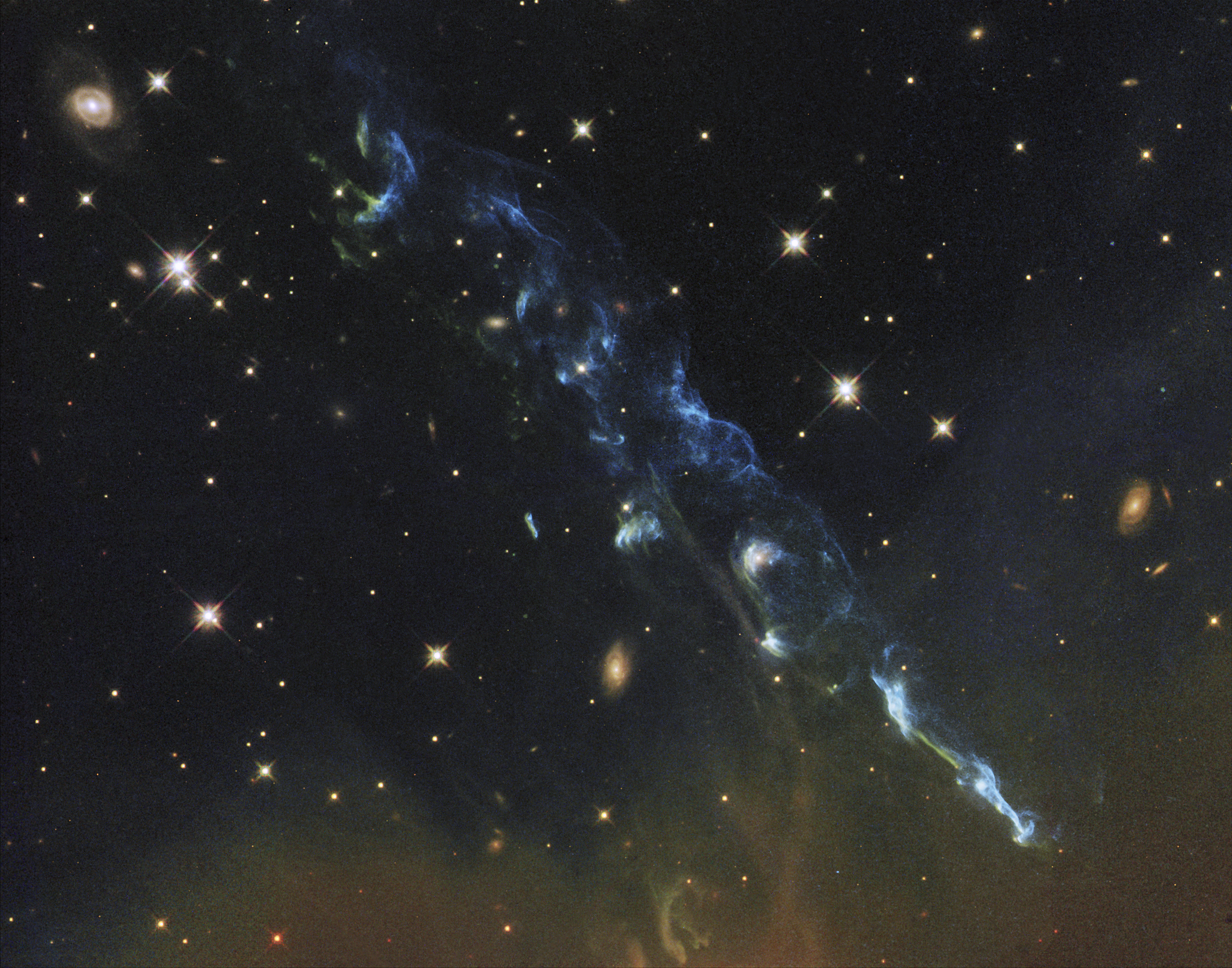
Herbig–Haro object HH 110 ejects gas through interstellar space.

The word 'interstellar' (between the stars) was coined by Francis Bacon in the context of the ancient theory of a literal sphere of fixed stars. Later in the 17th century, when the idea that stars were scattered through infinite space became popular, it was debated whether that space was a true vacuum or filled with a hypothetical fluid, sometimes called aether, as in René Descartes' vortex theory of planetary motions. While vortex theory did not survive the success of Newtonian physics, an invisible luminiferous aether was re-introduced in the early 19th century as the medium to carry light waves; e.g., in 1862 a journalist wrote: "this efflux occasions a thrill, or vibratory motion, in the ether which fills the interstellar spaces."

In 1864, William Huggins used spectroscopy to determine that a nebula is made of gas. Huggins had a private observatory with an 8-inch telescope, with a lens by Alvan Clark; but it was equipped for spectroscopy, which enabled breakthrough observations.

From around 1889, Edward Barnard pioneered deep photography of the sky, finding many 'holes in the Milky Way'. At first he compared them to sunspots, but by 1899 was prepared to write: "One can scarcely conceive a vacancy with holes in it, unless there is nebulous matter covering these apparently vacant places in which holes might occur". These holes are now known as dark nebulae, dusty molecular clouds silhouetted against the background star field of the galaxy; the most prominent are listed in his Barnard Catalogue. The first direct detection of cold diffuse matter in interstellar space came in 1904, when Johannes Hartmann observed the binary star Mintaka (Delta Orionis) with the Potsdam Great Refractor. Hartmann reported that absorption from the "K" line of calcium appeared "extraordinarily weak, but almost perfectly sharp" and also reported the "quite surprising result that the calcium line at 393.4 nanometres does not share in the periodic displacements of the lines caused by the orbital motion of the spectroscopic binary star". The stationary nature of the line led Hartmann to conclude that the gas responsible for the absorption was not present in the atmosphere of the star, but was instead located within an isolated cloud of matter residing somewhere along the line of sight to this star. This discovery launched the study of the interstellar medium.

Interstellar gas was further confirmed by Slipher in 1909, and then by 1912 interstellar dust was confirmed by Slipher. Interstellar sodium was detected by Mary Lea Heger in 1919 through the observation of stationary absorption from the atom's "D" lines at 589.0 and 589.6 nanometres towards Delta Orionis and Beta Scorpii.

In the series of investigations, Viktor Ambartsumian introduced the now commonly accepted notion that interstellar matter occurs in the form of clouds.

Subsequent observations of the "H" and "K" lines of calcium by Beals (1936) revealed double and asymmetric profiles in the spectra of Epsilon and Zeta Orionis. These were the first steps in the study of the very complex interstellar sightline towards Orion. Asymmetric absorption line profiles are the result of the superposition of multiple absorption lines, each corresponding to the same atomic transition (for example the "K" line of calcium), but occurring in interstellar clouds with different radial velocities. Because each cloud has a different velocity (either towards or away from the observer/Earth), the absorption lines occurring within each cloud are either blue-shifted or red-shifted (respectively) from the lines' rest wavelength through the Doppler Effect. These observations confirming that matter is not distributed homogeneously were the first evidence of multiple discrete clouds within the ISM.

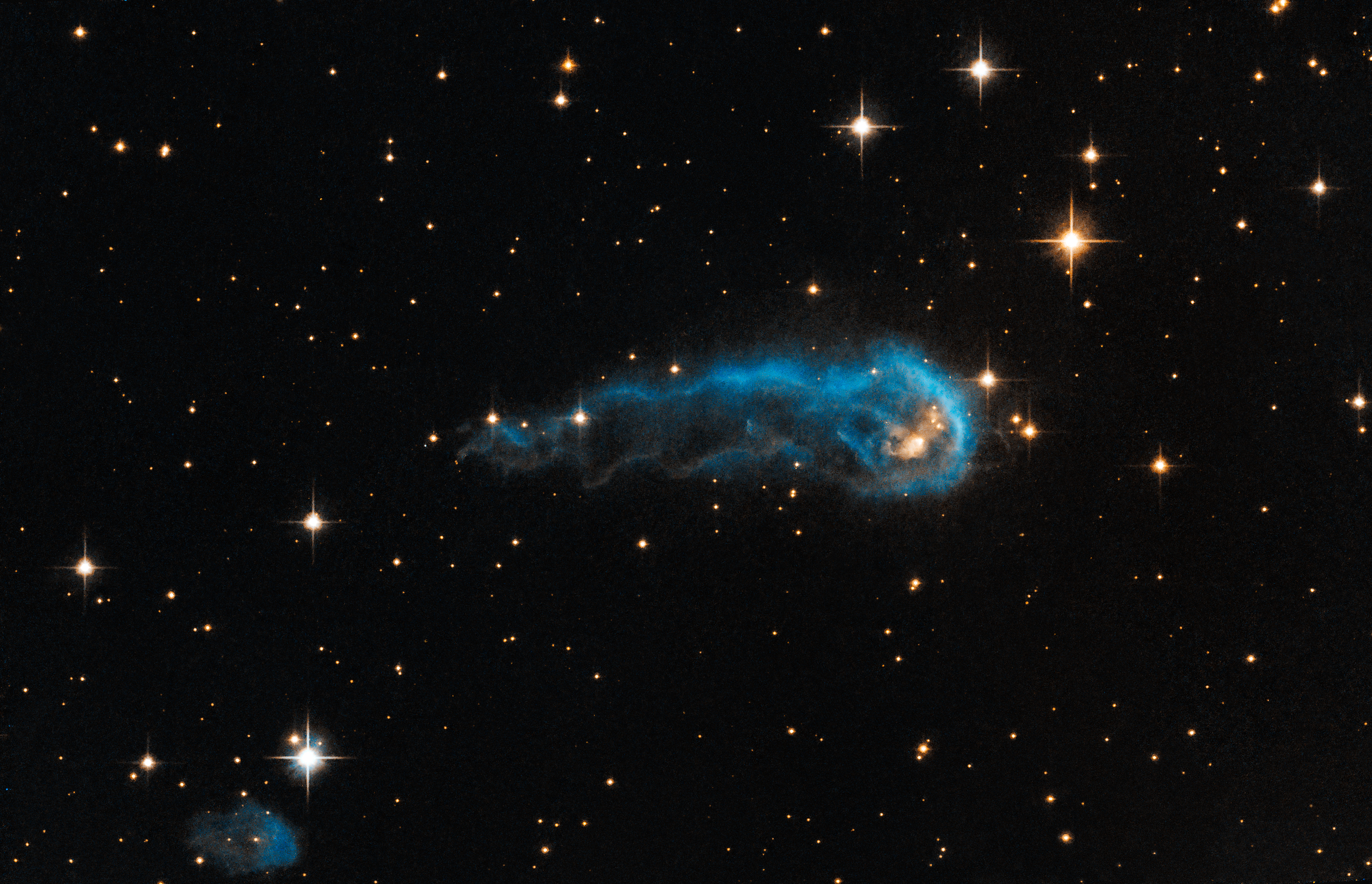
This light-year-long knot of interstellar gas and dust resembles a caterpillar.

The growing evidence for interstellar material led Pickering (1912) to comment: "While the interstellar absorbing medium may be simply the ether, yet the character of its selective absorption, as indicated by Kapteyn, is characteristic of a gas, and free gaseous molecules are certainly there, since they are probably constantly being expelled by the Sun and stars."

The same year, Victor Hess's discovery of cosmic rays, highly energetic charged particles that rain onto the Earth from space, led others to speculate whether they also pervaded interstellar space. The following year, the Norwegian explorer and physicist Kristian Birkeland wrote: "It seems to be a natural consequence of our points of view to assume that the whole of space is filled with electrons and flying electric ions of all kinds. We have assumed that each stellar system in evolutions throws off electric corpuscles into space. It does not seem unreasonable therefore to think that the greater part of the material masses in the universe is found, not in the solar systems or nebulae, but in 'empty' space" (Birkeland 1913).

Thorndike (1930) noted that "it could scarcely have been believed that the enormous gaps between the stars are completely void. Terrestrial aurorae are not improbably excited by charged particles emitted by the Sun. If the millions of other stars are also ejecting ions, as is undoubtedly true, no absolute vacuum can exist within the galaxy."

In September 2012, NASA scientists reported that polycyclic aromatic hydrocarbons (PAHs), subjected to interstellar medium (ISM) conditions, are transformed, through hydrogenation, oxygenation and hydroxylation, to more complex organics, "a step along the path toward amino acids and nucleotides, the raw materials of proteins and DNA, respectively". Further, as a result of these transformations, the PAHs lose their spectroscopic signature, which could be one of the reasons "for the lack of PAH detection in interstellar ice grains, particularly the outer regions of cold, dense clouds or the upper molecular layers of protoplanetary disks."

In February 2014, NASA announced a greatly upgraded database for tracking polycyclic aromatic hydrocarbons (PAHs) in the universe. According to scientists, more than 20% of the carbon in the universe may be associated with PAHs, possible starting materials for the formation of life. PAHs seem to have been formed shortly after the Big Bang, are widespread throughout the universe, and are associated with new stars and exoplanets.

In April 2019, scientists, working with the Hubble Space Telescope, reported the confirmed detection of the large and complex ionized molecules of buckminsterfullerene (C_{60}) (also known as "buckyballs") in the interstellar medium spaces between the stars.

In September 2020, evidence was presented of solid-state water in the interstellar medium, and particularly, of water ice mixed with silicate grains in cosmic dust grains.

== See also ==
- Astrophysical maser
- Diffuse interstellar band
- Fossil stellar magnetic field
- Heliosphere
- List of interstellar and circumstellar molecules
- Photodissociation region
