= HD 38029 =

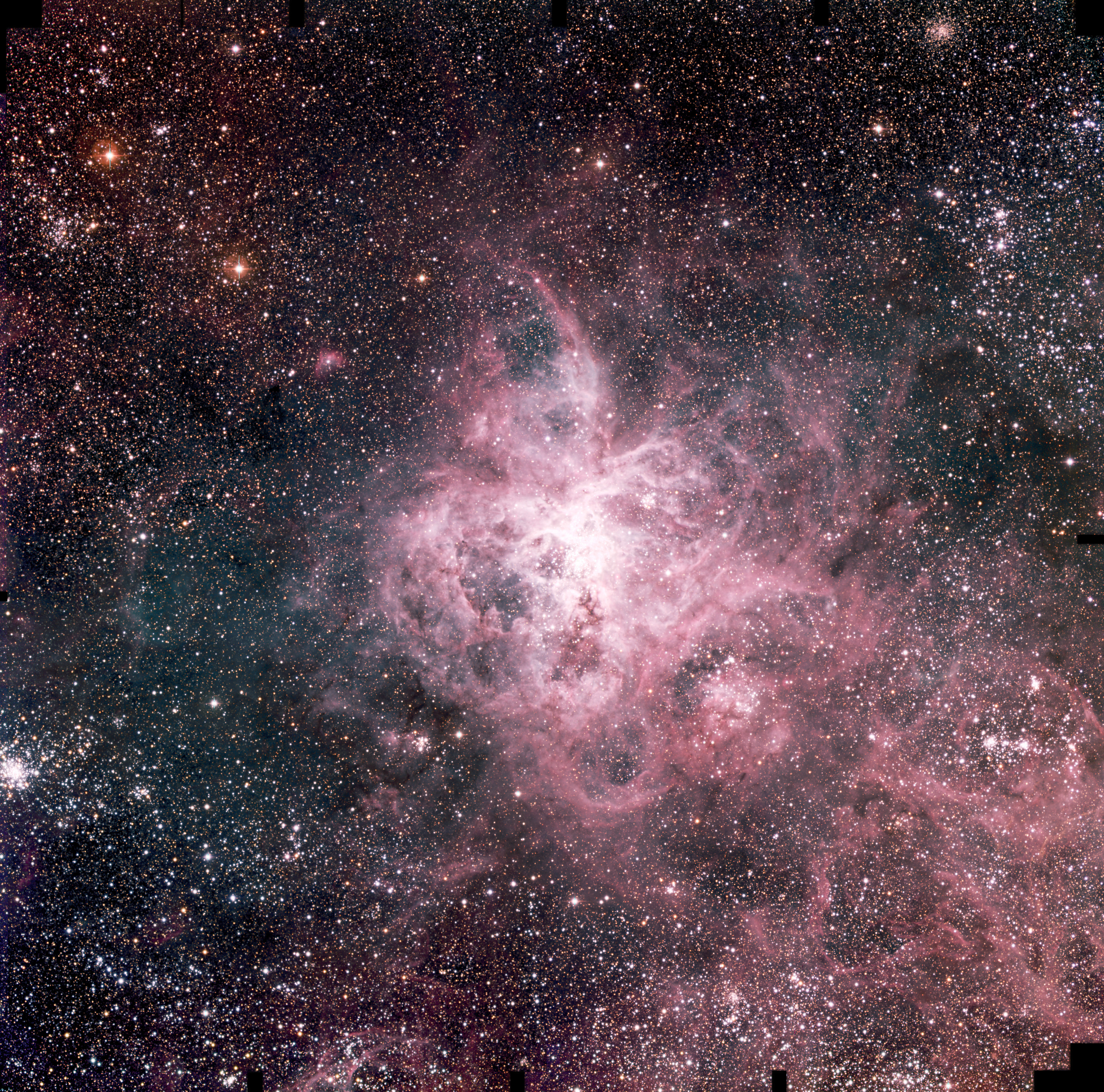
- Location of HD 38029 (circled in red) near the Tarantula Nebula

Observation data Epoch J2000.0 Equinox ICRS
- Constellation: Dorado
- A
- Right ascension: 05^{h} 36^{m} 54.63^{s}
- Declination: −69° 11′ 38.1″
- Apparent magnitude (V): 12.18
- B
- Right ascension: 05^{h} 36^{m} 55.19^{s}
- Declination: −69° 11′ 37.6″
- Apparent magnitude (V): 11.56±0.01

Characteristics

A
- Evolutionary stage: Wolf-Rayet
- Spectral type: WC4 + O6–6.5III

B
- Evolutionary stage: Hypergiant
- Spectral type: B1Ia+

Astrometry
Radial velocity (R_{v})	265.2 km/s
Distance	163,000 ly

B
Proper motion (μ)	RA: +1.878 mas/yr Dec.: +0.661 mas/yr
Parallax (π)	0.0360±0.0178 mas
Distance	approx. 90,000 ly (approx. 30,000 pc)

Details

B
Mass	71 M_{☉}
Radius	74 R_{☉}
Luminosity	1,072,000 L_{☉}
Surface gravity (log g)	2.50 cgs
Temperature	21,000 K
Rotational velocity (v sin i)	48 km/s
Age	2.9 Myr

Other designations
- HD 38029, BAT99-85, Brey 67, CPD−69°429, TIC 277172073, 2MASS J05365516-6911376, AKARI-IRC-V1 J0536538-691140, WISE J053654.95-691137.9
- A: VFTS 2, SK −69 223
- B: VFTS 3, SK −69 224

Database references
SIMBAD	AB
- A
- B

HD 38029 is a multiple star system located in the constellation of Dorado, in the Large Magellanic Cloud (LMC). The system lies near the prominent Tarantula Nebula star-forming region. It consists of a carbon-sequence Wolf–Rayet (WR) primary star (HD 38029A) paired with a type O giant companion, along with a nearby luminous B supergiant (HD 38029B) that is likely part of the same small star cluster named BSDL 2586. The combined magnitude of the three stars is 10.92. HD 38029 is notable for its strong stellar winds and has been studied extensively for insights into massive star evolution, interstellar medium interactions, and diffuse interstellar bands (DIBs) in low-metallicity environments like the LMC.

== Characteristics ==
HD 38029A is classified as a WC4 + O6–6.5 III binary, where the primary is a hot, helium and carbon-rich WR star exhibiting broad emission lines from its intense stellar winds, and the secondary is an O-type giant. Earlier observations classified the WR component as WC5. The WR star's spectrum shows prominent carbon lines (e.g., CIV, CIII) indicative of the carbon sequence (WC subtype), marking it as an evolved massive star (initial mass likely >25 solar masses) in a pre-supernova phase with high mass-loss rates. The system's radial velocity is approximately +265 km/s, consistent with LMC membership.

The nearby HD 38029B is a B1 Ia+ hyper/supergiant with broad Balmer absorption lines potentially distorted by DIBs along the line of sight, located about 2.8 arcseconds (~0.8 parsecs at LMC distance) from HD 38029A. The combined visual magnitude of the system is 11.55, with moderate reddening E(B−V) ≈ 0.32 due to LMC interstellar dust. The WR winds drive an expanding interstellar bubble, contributing to feedback in the 30 Doradus region, analogous to structures in the Milky Way's Orion Nebula.

== Observation ==
HD 38029 has been observed with the Hubble Space Telescope's Cosmic Origins Spectrograph (COS) under program GO-12581, yielding far-ultraviolet spectra (G130M/1327 + G160M/1577/1589/1600) on 24 October 2012 to probe wind lines (e.g., SiIV λλ1393, 1402) and interstellar features. These data support studies of massive star winds in low-metallicity settings and DIB properties in the LMC. It is also part of the ULLYSES (Ultraviolet Legacy Library of Young Stars as Essential Standards) survey, providing archival UV data for evolutionary models.

Ground-based spectroscopy from the VFTS has revealed broad Balmer wings in the B supergiant component, offering tests for atmospheric models distorted by foreground DIBs.
