= David Coulton =

English author, newspaper owner, and editor (1810–1857)

David Trevena Coulton (3 October 1810 – 8 May 1857) was an English author, newspaper proprietor and editor.

== Early life ==
David Trevena Coulton was born on 3 October 1810 in Devizes, Wiltshire, the youngest of four surviving children (Edwin, Sophie, Philip & David) of the bookseller and author James Trevena Coulton and his wife Sophia Pain, daughter of a tripe dealer. He was tutored at home.

In May 1823, when Coulton was 12, his father died in Kensington. He was the son of Walter Trevena Coulton, a master at Bristol Grammar School, and grandson of the Rev. James Coulton, ordained in 1770; and had published a theological work.

== Founder of The Britannia newspaper ==
Coulton founded The Britannia newspaper, first published on 20 April 1839; the aim of which was to "extend and popularise the principles of conservatism as embodied in the institutions of the realm". Samuel Carter Hall, who worked as general manager on the Britannia, wrote that it was backed by capital from "an eminent distiller". He commented that at this point Coulton was "undistinguished in letters", but later developed as a political writer and critic. Thomas Finlayson Henderson in the Dictionary of National Biography considered that Coulton, as a journalist, "while a close reasoner, ... possessed considerable skill in the popular exposition of complex questions."

Hall commented, further, that George Croly was a leader writer for Britannia, but much of it was his own work. It was a weekly; from vol. 4 (1843) the paper's title was The Britannia and Conservative Journal. In 1855/6 it was merged with John Bull, in a disputed deal between George Edward Biber, the printer John Mortimer, and Charles Gipps Prowett.

Coulton's professional address during the 1840s was 12 New Inn, Strand, London. In 1847 he ceased to be an active journalist of the weekly.

In 1846 Coulton was living at 1 Claremont Place, Brixton, when his friend Benjamin Robert Haydon, living on London's Edgware Road, involved him in his suicide, by sending his wife Mary to fetch him with a business matter as pretext. They were social acquaintances, and after Coulton dined with Haydon in 1845, Haydon in his diary called him a "very clever fellow". Coulton's mother died at Brixton in 1848. In 1850 he married, sold The Britannia, and settled at Goudhurst, Kent, where he farmed.

== The Press ==
Quite soon after Benjamin Disraeli founded in 1853 The Press, a Tory weekly, Coulton was brought in as its editor, replacing the journalist Samuel Lucas. He took over the writing of the leading articles, which up to this point had mostly fallen to Disraeli. T. E. Kebbel, who wrote for the Press from 1855, in his 1888 biography of Disraeli called Coulton Disraeli's "most confidential servant", and related that, when Parliament was sitting, Disraeli used to give Coulton, on Friday nights, "all the newest arguments and information"; and for the Dictionary of National Biography Kebbel wrote that Disraeli visited Coulton at home on Thursdays. Most of Disraeli's letters to Coulton, however, may not have survived. Contributors to the Press also included Disraeli's old friends George Smythe and Edward Bulwer-Lytton.

Coulton moved to 22 Park Prospect, Great Queen Street, Westminster. He became a figure of the literary world, and Robert Bell recruited him in 1856 to help buttress the Royal Literary Fund, under attack from Charles Dickens.

== Last year and death ==
On 17 April 1857, Coulton's brother Edwin Trevena Coulton died in Macclesfield. Having travelled to Macclesfield, Coulton developed bronchitis. At this point Coulton was already seriously ill, and in his place Daniel Owen Madden consulted Disraeli on 21 April about the political line the Press should take.

David Trevena Coulton died on 8 May 1857 in Brighton, leaving a widow and two children. He was interred in a family vault at Norwood. He was succeeded as editor of the Press by Frederick Wordsworth Haydon, second son of Benjamin Haydon, associated in the 1850s with the New Quarterly Review. The following editor was Robert Hogarth Patterson, to whom in 1858 Disraeli sold his stake in the Press. George Herbert Townsend then edited it, and ultimately the Press was taken over by the English Churchman in 1884.

== Works ==
In 1853 Coulton's three-volume novel Fortune - A Romance of Life, later titled: Fortune, A Story of London Life (in the nineteenth century), was published. It had been written much earlier in his life.

Coulton contributed regularly to the Quarterly Review. In 1851, he published there an Inquiry into the authorship of the Letters of Junius, proposing as author Thomas Lyttelton, 2nd Baron Lyttelton. In an 1852 review "California versus Free Trade", of Conservative Principles and Conservative Policy by Edward William Cox, and a speech by Charles Newdigate Newdegate, he advocated for tariffs on imports, limited to goods also produced in the United Kingdom. Later that year, he published "Gold Discoveries", also in the Quarterly Review.

An incomplete manuscript "The Threshold of Life, or Friendly Counsels to Youth In a series of Familiar Letters" was left by Coulton. A version is in the archives of the John Murray publishing house.

== Family ==
Coulton married on 23 April 1850, at St Bride's Church, Fleet Street in London, Sarah Boniface.

Their daughter Irene Sophie Coulton, born 1856, married in 1905, in Brussels, Clément François Joseph Boulmont.

=== Family finances ===
The deaths of Edwin and David Coulton in 1857 left two widows and children without support. A Royal Literary Fund dinner that year raised a subscription. Edwin's widow Mrs Sophia Coulton began lobbying Disraeli in May 1857. In 1861 William Synge approached Disraeli for help, in particular for Edwin's son Ambrose. He asked for introductions to William Schaw Lindsay and Brenton Halliburton.

From the early 1860s, David Coulton's wife, Mrs Sarah Coulton, and his elder sister, Miss Sophia Coulton, applied for assistance to the Royal Literary Fund.
