= George Wallis =

English painter

George Wallis FSA
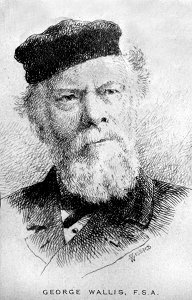
- Self-portrait
- Born: 8 June 1811; Wolverhampton, England
- Died: 24 October 1891 (aged 80); Wimbledon, England
- Occupations: Artist; educator; curator
- Known for: First Keeper of Fine Art, South Kensington Museum
- Children: Whitworth Wallis; Rosa Wallis

George Wallis FSA (8 June 1811 – 24 October 1891) was an English artist, art educator, and museum curator. He was the first Keeper of Fine Art Collection at South Kensington Museum (later the Victoria & Albert Museum) in London.

== Early years ==
George Wallis was born in Wolverhampton on 8 June 1811, the son of Mary (née Price; 1784–1864) and John Wallis (1783–1818). His father died early, Wallis was adopted by his grand-uncle John Worralow, a famous maker of steel jewellery at the time of George III. He was educated at the Grammar School from 1825 to 1827 and received initial training in japanned ware painting.

Wallis practised as an artist and art educator in Wolverhampton from 1827 to 1832, but then left for Manchester, where he lived for the next five years. He taught sisters Martha Darley Mutrie and Annie Feray Mutrie at the Manchester School of Design and later gave them both private classes. He attended the Royal Manchester Institution; practised painting; became connected with the local Manchester industry, and it was then and there that he met the engineer Joseph Whitworth (1803–1887) who became his lifelong friend.

In 1837, Wallis returned to Wolverhampton and worked for local japanners Ryton and Walton painting the centres of the tea trays. He designed the shape of a tray which was named "Victoria" after the young queen and became very popular. In 1841, Wallis moved to London to join the School of Design at Somerset House where he won one of the six scholarships offered by the Board of Trade.

== Art education ==
From 1843, he served as Headmaster in several Schools of Design organised by the Government.

=== The Spitalfields School of Design ===
In 1843 he was Headmaster of the Spitalfields School of Design. He left it after less than one year.

=== The Manchester School of Design ===
Wallis was Headmaster of Manchester School of Design in 1844–1846.

In two years from the time of Mr. Wallis taking the charge, the funds of the school were flourishing; the interest taken in it by the public was great, and nearly half the Institution was occupied by the pupils, while the applications for admission were more numerous than could be accommodated. Under this management the public, who care little for abstract art, were taught the close connexion between the instruction of the School of Design and their private pursuits.

Among his students were Welsh artist Clarence Whaite who became a lifelong friend, and William Muckley.

In 1845, Wallis organised at the Manchester Royal Institution the Industrial Art Exhibition which included items made of textile, ceramics, carved wood, leather and papier-mache. In the same year he delivered the first systematic course of lectures on the principles of decorative art, illustrated with drawings on the blackboard. These lectures led Lord Clarendon, then President of the Board of Trade, to ask Wallis to draw up a chart of artistic and scientific instruction as applied to industrial art. This chart was recognised as the basis of for industrial art education in Britain in the late 19th century.

He resigned from the Manchester School of Design in 1846, as he could not agree with proposed changes in the educational programme.

=== Birmingham School of Design ===
From 1852–1857, George Wallis was the Headmaster of the Birmingham School of Design, where one of his students was Bernard Walter Evans. In 1853 he was appointed to a Royal Commission to attend the Exhibition of Industry in the City of New York. Because of delays in setting up this Exhibition, Wallis and his fellow Commissioner Joseph Whitworth were asked instead to undertake visits to various manufacturing sites in America and report back. Wallis was given responsibility for reporting on textiles, metal manufacture, glass, porcelain and furniture. Atkinson in his book on Joseph Whitworth states that Wallis was appointed along with Whitworth particularly ‘to compare side by side the military weapons of the two countries’ as Wallis was also the head of the only school of rifle design in Britain and an acknowledged expert in the matter of small arms. However, Atkinson does not provide any evidence for this in his book, and when addressing the Parliamentary Committee on Small Arms in 1854 about visits he had made to two American arms factories, Wallis made it clear that he had never designed or studied guns, was unable to give a professional opinion upon musket making, and could only comment in general terms about his impression of the organisation of work in the factories. In 1855, he organised in Birmingham an Exhibition of Works of Industrial Art as an experiment in the circulation of artworks from central depositories around regional museums.

== The Great Exhibitions ==
George Wallis was appointed a deputy commissioner for the Great Exhibition of 1851, and he successfully acted for several manufacturing districts and the whole of Ireland. During the period of the Exhibition he was Superintendent of the British textile division, and a deputy commissioner of juries.

Later he also was actively involved in preparation and overseeing of different international exhibitions: in 1853 he was one of the six commissioners sent by the government to the 1853 New York International Exhibition, with additional duties to analyse the development of art and manufactures in America. Wallis reported that his 5,000 miles long tour embraced "the States of Massachusetts, Connecticut, New Hampshire, Rhode Island, New York, New Jersey, Pennsylvania, Maryland, the District of Columbia, Eastern Virginia, Kentucky, and Ohio." From his report and that of Sir Joseph Whitworth on machinery was compiled 'The Industry of the United States' (1854).

In 1855, he was appointed Special Superintendent of British and Colonial manufactures which were displayed at the International 1855 Exhibition in Paris. He was then actively engaged in the British section of the Paris Universal Exhibitions of 1862 and 1867. In the collection of Wolverhampton Art Gallery, there is a number of medals awarded to him by Queen Victoria, Prince Albert, and Louis-Napoleon of France.

In 1869, he initiated the similar 'South Staffordshire Industrial and Fine Arts Exhibition' which was held at Wolverhampton.

=== At The South Kensington Museum ===
In 1858 George Wallis joined the South Kensington Museum as Senior Keeper of the Art collection, a post which he kept for three decades and left just prior to his death. He actively fostered the system of circulating works of art, wrote in all the leading art periodicals, and was one of the earliest contributors to the 'Art Journal,' besides delivering a vast number of lectures on design and kindred subjects.

On 7 March 1878 he was elected a Fellow of the Society of Antiquaries of London (FSA).

== Artworks ==
Although George Wallis abandoned early an idea of a professional artistic career, he continued practising drawing, painting and etching as a hobby. In the collections of Victoria & Albert Museum, Birmingham Museum and Art Gallery, Wolverhampton Art Gallery, Nottingham Castle Museum and Art Gallery, there are a number of Wallis' artworks.

== Family ==
George Wallis married Matilda Condell (1818–1888) in 1842. Two of their children died in infancy. After obtaining the post of Keeper at the South Kensington Museum, the Wallises settled down permanently at 4, The Residences, South Kensington, where four surviving children – George Harry (1847–1936), Jane Kate (1849–1934), Whitworth (1855–1927) and Rosa (1857-c.1939) – were brought up. George Harry and Whitworth were given a good education and trained by their father at the South Kensington Museum. George Harry became the first Director of the Nottingham Castle Museum & Art Gallery (open in 1878). Whitworth Wallis was the First Director of the Birmingham Museum & Art Gallery (open in 1883). He was knighted in 1912.

Rosa Wallis was trained at Manchester Royal College of Art and in Berlin. She became a well-established painter of flowers and landscapes, an etcher and enameller. She travelled widely around Britain and Europe, visiting Italy, France and Austria. Between 1880 and 1930, she had at least six personal shows, exhibiting about 300 artworks.

George Wallis died at 21 St. George's Road, Wimbledon, Surrey, on 24 October 1891, and was buried in Highgate Cemetery on 28 October. A number of his memorabilia and artworks were given by his children to museums associated with him: the Victoria and Albert Museum, the Birmingham Museum & Art Gallery, the Wolverhampton Art Gallery and the Nottingham Castle Museum & Art Gallery. An exhibition in memory of George Wallis was organised at the Wolverhampton Art Gallery in 1919.

== Gallery ==
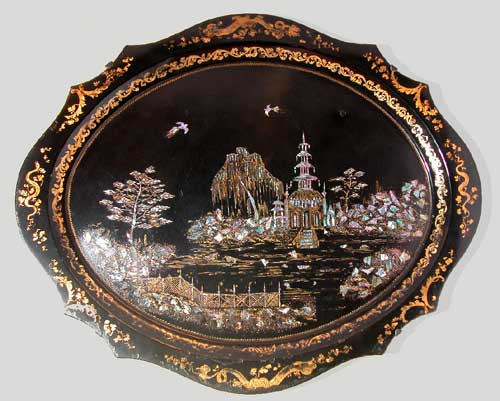
Japanned tray of 'Victoria' shape. 1850s

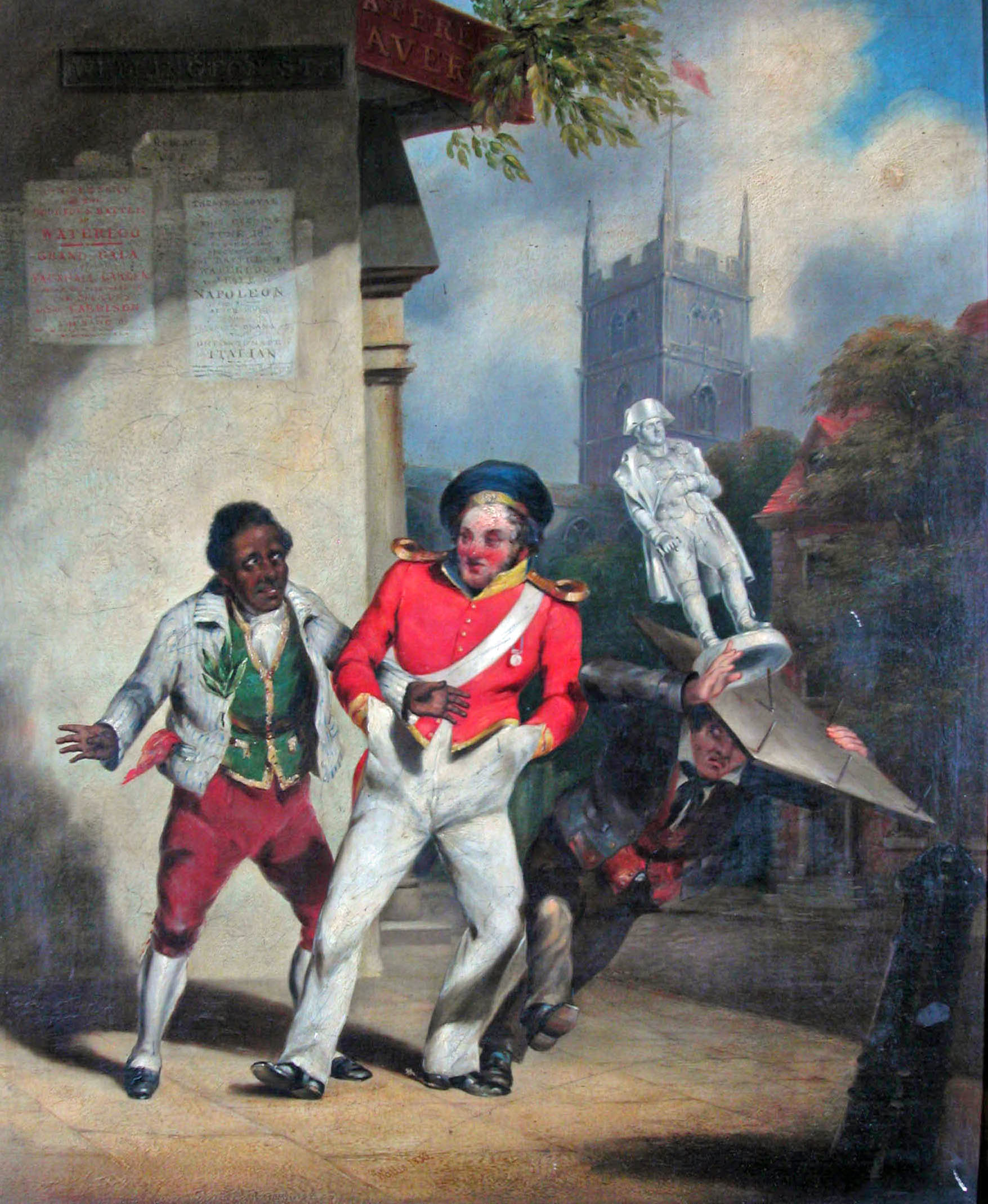
G Wallis. Fall of Napoleon. 1836

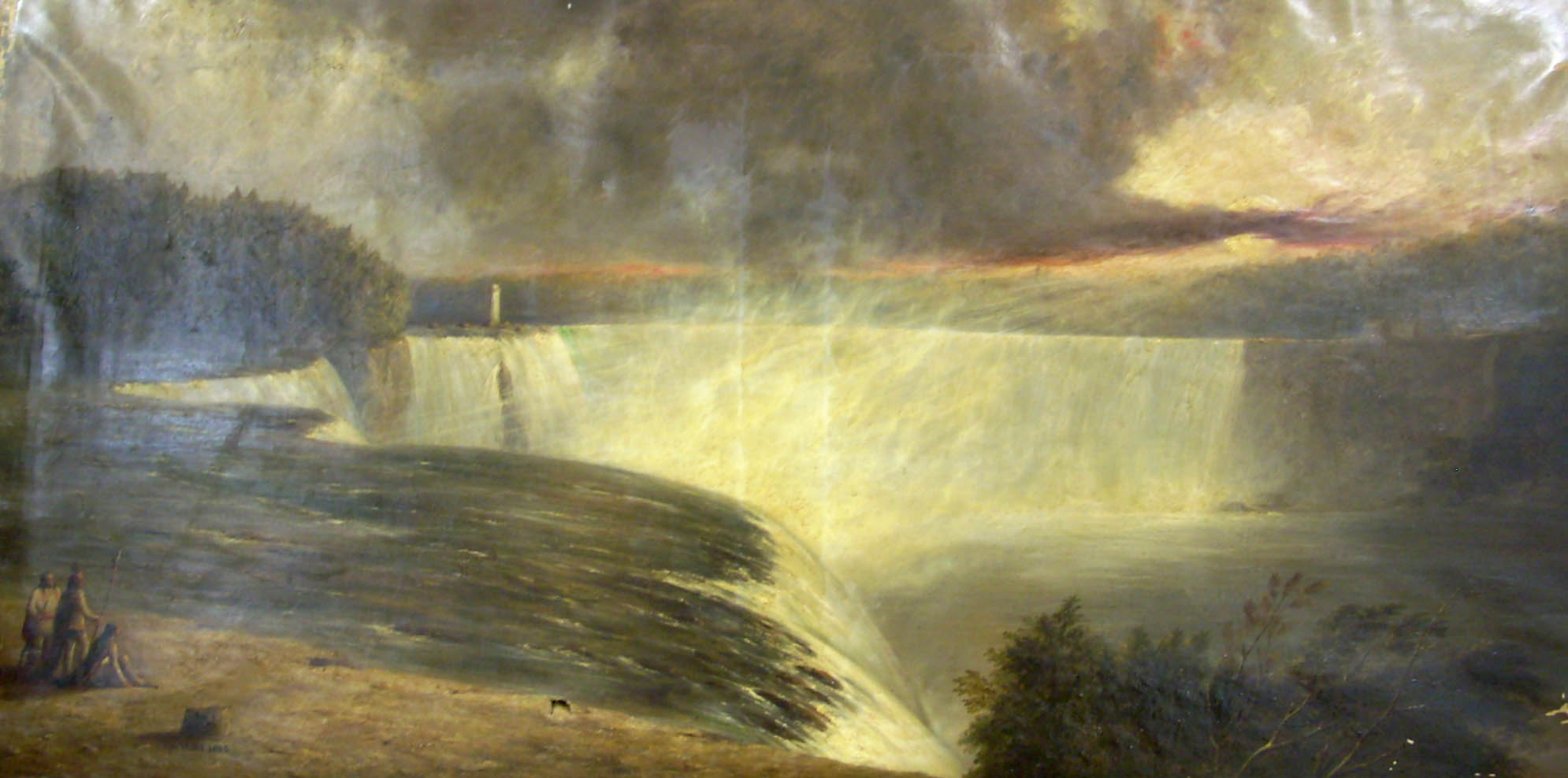
George Wallis, The Niagara Falls (1855).

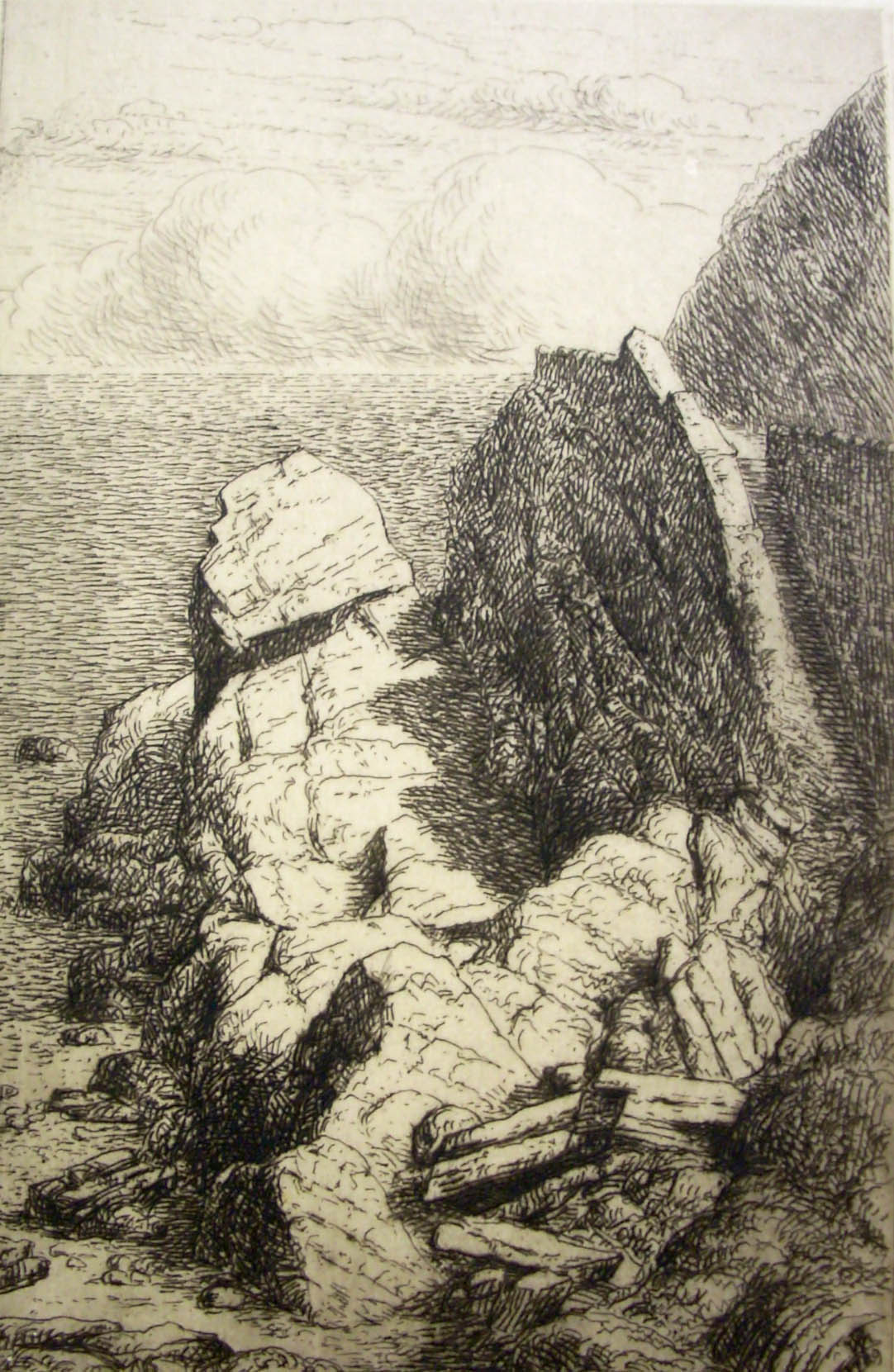
George Wallis. Ilfracombe. Etching

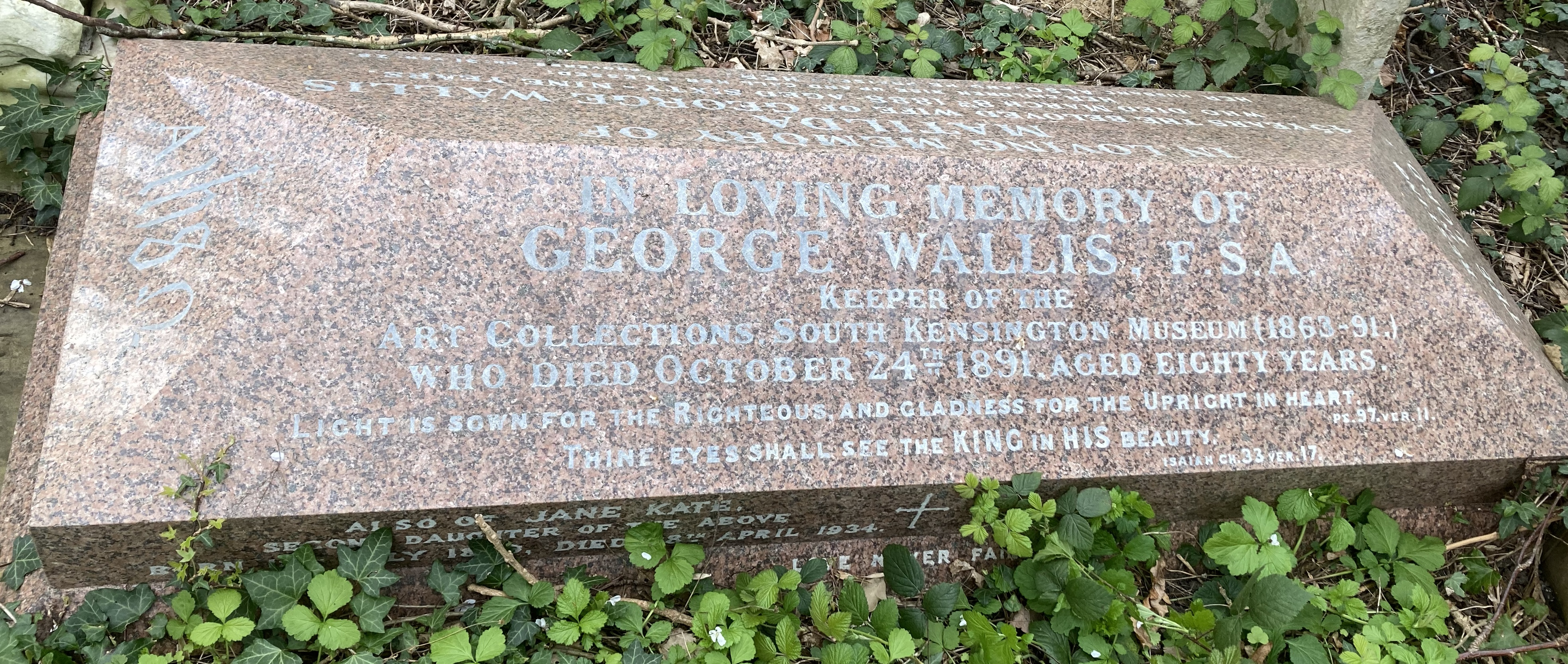
Family grave of George Wallis in Highgate Cemetery

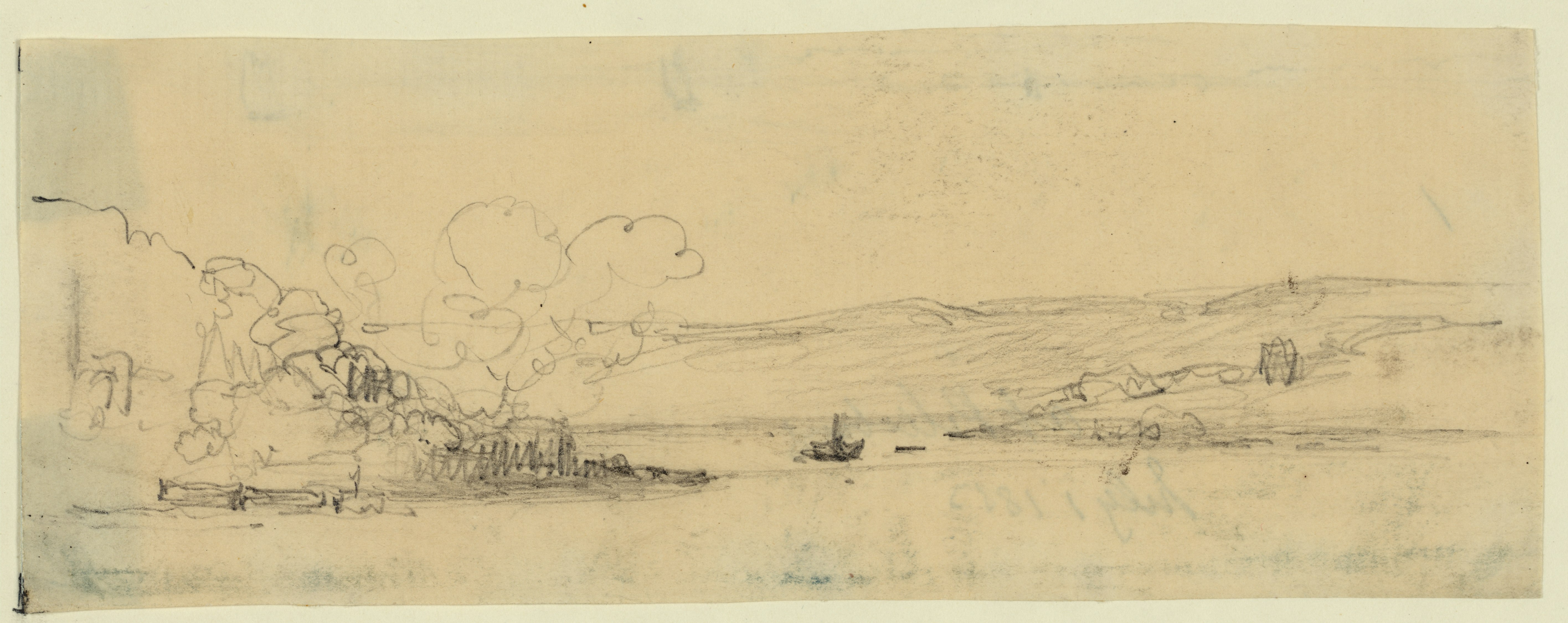
At Pittsburg

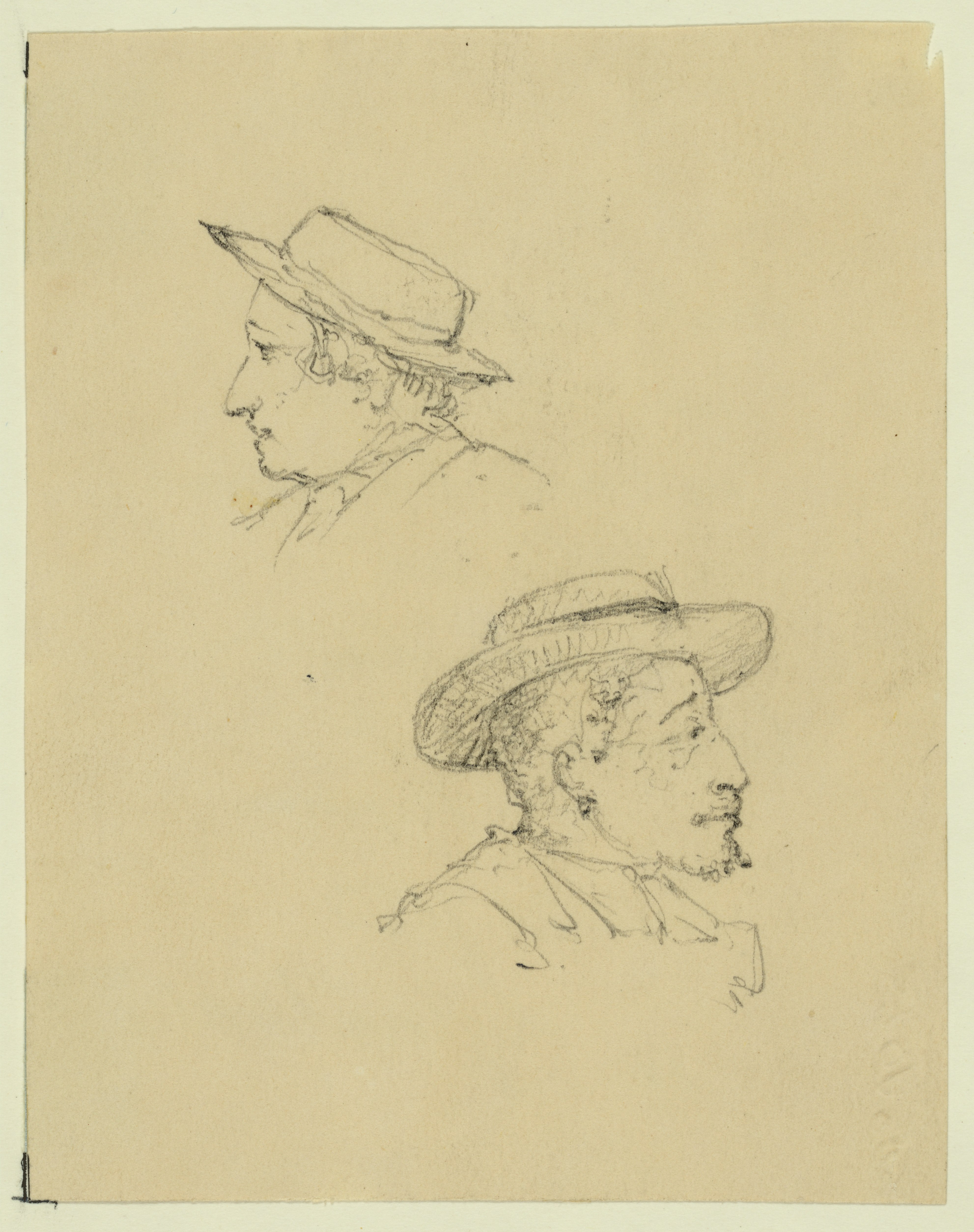
Steamboat on Potomac

== Selected publications ==
- ‘On the Cultivation of a Popular Taste in the Fine Arts,’ 1839.
- Introductory Address, delivered 15 January 1844, to the Students of the Manchester School of Design, Manchester, 1844.
- The Study of the History, Principles and Practice of Ornamental Art: an address delivered 20 January 1845, to the Students of the Manchester School of Design, Manchester, 1845.
- A Letter to the Council of the Manchester School of Design on the System of Teaching pursued in that School, London, 1845.
- A Farewell Letter to the Council, Subscribers, Friends and Students of the Manchester School of Design: containing a full exposition of the Circumstances Leading to his Resignation, London & Manchester, 1846.
- Art, Science and Manufacture as a Unity, an essay in four chapters: what we have been doing, what we are doing, what we ought to do, what we can do, The Art Journal, 1 October and 1 November 1851.
- (with Sir Joseph Whitworth) The Industry of the United States in Machinery, Manufactures and Useful and Applied Arts, compiled from the Official Reports of Messrs Whitworth and Wallis, London, 1854.
- Report on the Re-Organisation of the Government School of Art, Birmingham, in the Years 1852, 1853 and 1854, London, 1854.
- Schools of Art in Relation to Trade and Manufactures, Birmingham, 1855.
- Recent Progress in Design as Applied to Manufacture, Journal of the Society of Arts, Vol. 4, 14 March 1856.
- Schools of Art: their Constitution and Management, comprising a Statement of the Present Position and Working of the Birmingham Central and Branch Schools, London, 1857 (a print of a paper delivered to the National Association for the Promotion of Science at Birmingham).
- Catalogue of the Exhibition of Works of Art-Manufacture designed or executed by Students of the Schools of Art, London, 1858.
- On Embroidery by Machinery, Journal of the Society of Arts, 8 April 1859.
- Address and Introductory Instructions to William Wallis's Drawing Book, Elementary Series, London, 1859.
- Fifty Diagrams to Illustrate the Delineation of Form, adapted to the Author's Lessons on the same Subject: with a preface containing Hints to Teachers on the Early Education of the Hand and Eye, London, [nd].
- Diagrams and Instructions to the Used in the Collective Teaching of Elementary Linear Drawing, London, [nd].
- The Art-Manufactures of Birmingham and Midland Counties in the International Exhibition of 1862, Birmingham, 1862 (re-printed from the Midland Counties Herald).
- The New Art of Auto-Typography, Journal of the Society of Arts, 17 April 1863. Reprint 1868.
- The Royal House of Tudor: a Series of Biographical Sketches, illustrated with a Series of Portraits executed from Authentic Contemporary Works, reduced from Photographs taken from the original, London, 1866.
- Technical Education: a Letter, Birmingham, 1868.
- Special Report on the Local Manufactures of South Staffordshire and East Worcestershire as represented in the South Staffordshire Exhibition held at Wolverhampton, 1869, London/Wolverhampton?, [1869].
- The Art Journal Catalogue of the International Exhibition of 1871, Art Journal, 1871.
- The Art Journal Catalogue of the International Exhibition of 1872, Art Journal, 1872.
- Language by Touch: a Narrative Illustrating the Instruction of the Blind and Deaf Mute, London, [1873].
- Swedenborg and Modern Culture, London, 1875.
- Decorative Art in Britain: Past, Present and Future, G. Falkner, Manchester, 1877.
- Jewellery, article in: George P. Bevan, ed., British Manufacturing Industries series 1878.
- Original Designs for Art Manufacture, The Art Journal, 1880.
- British Art, Pictorial, Decorative and Industrial: a Fifty Years' Retrospect, 1832 to 1852, Chapman and Hall, London and Thomas Forman, Nottingham, 1882. (A paper read before the Arts Society, Nottingham Castle, on Tuesday, 31 October 1882).
- [editor] Comparative Anatomy as Applied to the Purposes of the Artist, London, 1883.
- Introduction to A Catalogue of Manufactures, Decorations and Designs, the Work of Students of the Schools of Art in Great Britain and Ireland, in connection with the Science and Arts Museums of South Kensington, W. Clowes, London, 1884.

== Literature ==
- G. James Daichendt (2011). The 19th Century Artist-Teacher: A Case Study of George Wallis and the Creation of a New Identity, International Journal of Art and Design Education, 30(1), pp. 71–80.
- G. James Daichendt (2009). George Wallis: The original artist-teacher. Teaching Artist Journal, 7(4), pp 219–226.
- G. James Daichendt (2009). Artist-Teacher George Wallis: Redefining the Concept Through History. Unpublished Ed.D. Dissertation, Teachers College, Columbia University.
- Frank Sharman. George Wallis: A Pioneer of Industrial Art.
- Olga Baird. The Knights of Museums: The Wallis family and their memorabilia in the collection of Wolverhampton Art Gallery. /Birmingham Historian. Issue 32, 2008.
- George Wallis, FSA (1811–91). Keeper of the Art Collections.
- G. James Daichendt. Artist-Teacher: A Philosophy for Creating and Teaching. Bristol, UK: Intellect Books. 2010
