= Mary Lea Heger =

American astronomer

Mary Lea Heger (July 13, 1897 – July 13, 1983, later Mary Lea Shane) was an American astronomer who made important discoveries on the interstellar medium. She later founded the Lick Observatory Archives located in the Dean E. McHenry Library. In 1982, her monument at Lick was renamed the Mary Lea Shane Archives of Lick Observatory.

== Education and career ==
She was born in Wilmington, Delaware. During childhood, Heger's family moved west to Belvedere on the San Francisco Bay, where she spent her youth.

Heger received her bachelor's degree in 1919 from the University of California, Berkeley, becoming a graduate student in astronomy. After marrying C. Donald Shane in 1920 she completed her PhD in 1924, writing a thesis under the supervision of W. W. Campbell at Lick Observatory that was one of the first papers to recognize the sharp, stationary Na I absorption lines in the spectra of distant binaries as interstellar in origin. She was also the discoverer of the diffuse interstellar bands.

== Retirement ==
Deciding to focus on raising her two small children, Heger gave up the notion of a professional career. At the end of World War II when her husband became director of Lick Observatory, Heger became a well-known scientific hostess and was remembered for her generous hospitality.

== Death ==
Mary Lea Shane died on her 86th birthday of a heart attack at her home in Scotts Valley, California on July 13, 1983.
