= G. Phillips Bevan =

British statistician

George Phillips Bevan
- Born: 1829; Beaufort, Blaenau Gwent
- Died: 1889 (aged 59–60)

George Phillips Bevan (1829–1889) FSS FGS was a Welsh statistician, geographer and author, and the brother of William Latham Bevan.

His father was William Hibbs Bevan (1788–1846), who was high sheriff for Breconshire in 1841, and his brother, William Bevan, was archdeacon of Brecon from 1875. His mother Margaret, daughter of Joseph Latham, was also of Beaufort. He was educated at Rugby School, going on to graduate from St Andrew's University with M.D. in 1850, having also studied at King's College, London, and Edinburgh University. He was Surgeon for the Beaufort Iron Works at the time of the 1851 census. By 1858 he was a Fellow of the Geological Society and contributed a paper (in two parts) to the journal The Geologist. He was a partner in Bevan & Brewer, Colliery Proprietors until that company was dissolved in 1864. By 1871 he had moved to Kensington and is listed in the census as a Scientific author.

== Bevan's Statistical Atlas (1882) ==
His Statistical Atlas was a massive tome with 45 plates, each 20×28 inches, and many statistical tables.

It provides a useful reference list of schools of the period.

=== The Educational Condition of the United Kingdom ===
These tables and map provide a useful reference to educational institutions of the 1880s, including statistical information about the following:

- Primitive Methodist
  - York Jubilee School (Elmfield College)
  - Birmingham Bourne College
- Moravian
  - Fulneck School
  - Gomersal School
  - Mirfield School
  - Wyke School

== Publications ==
- 1858 On the Geology of the Beaufort and Ebbw Vale District of the South Wales Coal-field. The Geologist 1(2), Feb, pp. 49–54;1(4), Apr, pp. 124–129
- 1880 The strikes of the past ten years. Journal of the Statistical Society of London, 43(1), 35–64.
- 1880 Tourists' Guide to the West Riding of Yorkshire ... With ... Maps.
- 1882 The Statistical Atlas of England, Scotland and Ireland. Edinburgh & London: W. & A. K. Johnston

== British Manufacturing Industries ==
Bevan edited a series of volumes consisting of papers on primary manufacturing and crafts in the UK. There were 15 volumes, published from 1876 to 1878.

Year	Volume	Contents	Comments
1876	1	Iron and Steel by William Mattieu Williams; Copper Smelting by John Arthur Phillips; Brass Founding, Tin Plate and Zinc Working by Walter Graham
	2	Metallic Mining and Collieries by Warington Wilkinson Smyth; Coal by Alexander Galletly; Building Stones by Edward Hull; Explosive Compounds by William Mattieu Williams
	3	Guns, Nails, Locks, Wood Screws, Railway Bolts and Spikes, Buttons, Pins, Needles, Saddlery and Electroplate by William Costen Aitken; Pens and Papier-mâché by G. Lindsey
	4	Acids, Alkalies, Soda, Ammonia and Soap by Arthur Herbert Church; Oils and Candles by William Mattieu Williams; Gas and Lighting by Robert Hogarth Patterson
	5	Wool, and its Applications by Thomas Croxen Archer; Flax and Linen by William Thomas Charley; Cotton by Isaac Watts; Silk by B. F. Cobb
	6	Hosiery and Lace by William Felkin; Carpets by Christopher Dresser; Dyeing and Bleaching by T. Sims
	7	Pottery by Joseph François Leon Arnoux; Glass and Silicates by Frederick Settle Barff; Furniture and Woodwork by John Hungerford Pollen
	8	Paper by Thomas Croxen Archer; Printing and Bookbinding by Joseph Hatton; Engraving by Samuel Davenport; Toys by George Christopher Trout Bartley
	9	Tobacco by John Dunning; Hides and Leather by Janes Collins; Gutta Percha and Indiarubber by James Collins; Fibres and Cordage by Peter Lund Simmonds
	10	Shipbuilding by Bedford Pim; Telegraphy by Robert Sabine; Agricultural Machinery by John Wrightson; Railways and Tramways by Daniel Kinnear Clark
	11	Jewellery by George Wallis; Gold Working by Charles Boutell; Watches and Clocks by Frederick James Britten; Musical Instruments by Edward Francis Rimbault; Cutlery by Frederick Callis
	12	Salt, Preservation of Food, Bread and Biscuits by John Jackson Manley; Sugar Refining by Charles Haughton Gill; Butter and Cheese by Morgan Evans; Brewing, Distilling by Thomas Alexander Pooley
	13	Bevan, The Industrial Classes and Industrial Statistics.
	14	Bevan, The Industrial Classes and Industrial Statistics.
1877	15	Horticulture by Frederick William Thomas Burbidge
