= Annie Feray Mutrie =

British still-life painter (1826–1893)

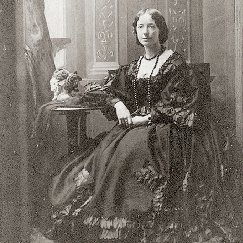
- Born: 6 March 1826; Ardwick
- Died: 28 September 1893 (aged 67); Brighton
- Education: Manchester School of Design
- Occupation: painter
- Known for: Still life painting
- Relatives: Martha Darley Mutrie (sister)

Annie Feray Mutrie (6 March 1826 – 28 September 1893) was a British still-life painter. She exhibited regularly and she and her sister Martha were considered the best flower painters in oils.

== Life ==
Mutrie was born in Ardwick in 1826. She was the youngest daughter of Sarah and Robert Mutrie, a cotton trader from Rothesay, Bute in Scotland. She had an elder sister Martha and they would follow very similar careers. Mutrie and her sister attended Manchester School of Design and studied under George Wallis. She exhibited in Manchester and in the 1850s they started to exhibit at the Royal Academy. The two sisters moved to London in 1854. The following year Annie was exhibiting at the Royal Academy where her paintings of Orchids and Azaleas were lauded by John Ruskin who, in time, bought two Mutrie paintings.

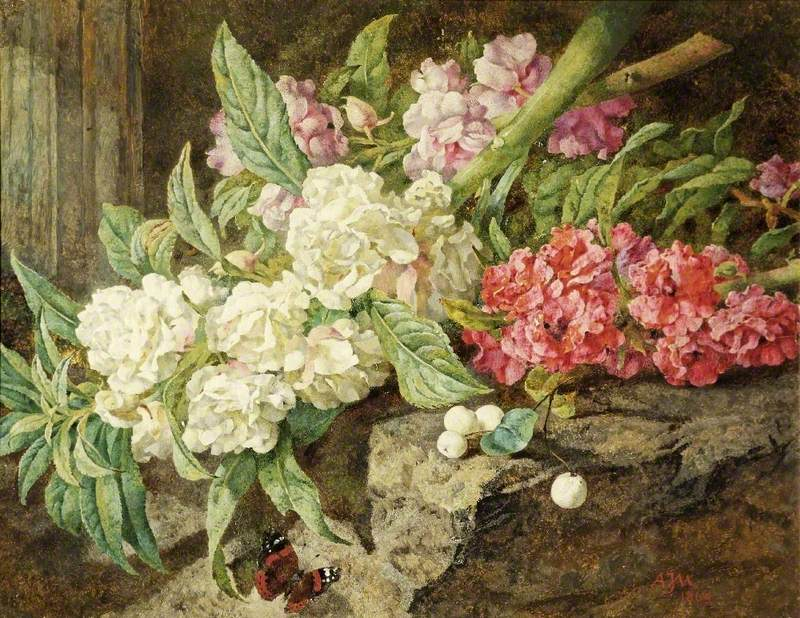
Flower Study with a Butterfly from the Russell-Cotes Art Gallery & Museum

Annie painted flowers; with roses and orchids being favoured. She exhibited regularly and despite her gender other artists bought her work. Moreover, both the Royal Academy and John Ruskin were known for their poor regard for women artists and despite this Ruskin continued to compliment her work and the Royal Academy saw her nominated to be an associate member.

Martha died in 1885 and Annie died in 1893 in Brighton.

== Legacy ==
Mutrie has paintings in the Victoria and Albert Museum, the Harris Museum and Art Gallery, Preston and the Russell-Cotes Art Gallery & Museum in Bournemouth.

Also The Amelia Scott, Tunbridge Wells, has an Oil painting entitled 'Fruit and Flowers' depicting pineapple, grapes, apples and pomegranate in a silver 'epergne' and various flowers on a table. The canvas measures 30" by 24" and is signed A.F.M." TUNWM : 1952.86.25 . This is part of a bequest, 1952 from E.R Ashton.
