= Whitworth Wallis =

Sir Whitworth Wallis
- Born: 23 June 1855; Handsworth, Birmingham, England
- Died: 16 January 1927 (aged 71); Stratford-on-Avon, England
- Occupation(s): Director, Birmingham Museum and Art Gallery
- Parent: George Wallis

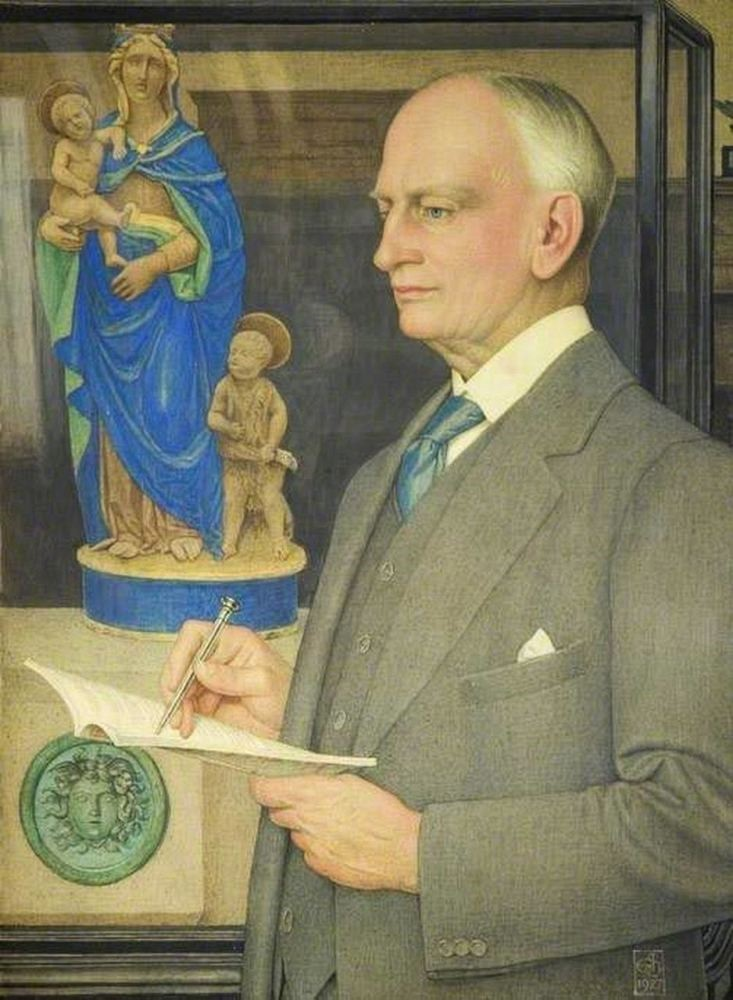
Portrait of Sir Whitworth Wallis by Joseph Edward Southall, 1927

Whitworth Wallis (23 June 1855 – 16 January 1927) was the first director of Birmingham Museum and Art Gallery (opened in 1885). He was knighted in 1912.

== Early years ==
Whitworth Wallis was born in Handsworth, Birmingham, and was educated privately in London, Paris and Hanover.

== Family ==
He was the son of artist George Wallis (1811–1891), also the first Keeper of Fine Art Collection at South Kensington Museum (later the Victoria & Albert Museum), and Matilda Condell (1818–1888), who married in 1842. His father's lifelong friend was Sir Joseph Whitworth.

Two of his siblings died in infancy. The others were George Harry (1847–1936; the first Director of Nottingham Castle Museum & Art Gallery, opened 1878), Jane Kate (1849–1934), and Rosa (1857–c.1939; also a successful artist). The family lived at 4, The Residences, South Kensington. He died in Stratford-on-Avon on 16 January 1927 at the age of 71.

== Career ==
Whitworth, like George Harry, was trained by his father at the South Kensington Museum. He was placed in charge of Bethnal Green Museum (later the V&A Museum of Childhood) in 1879 and became curator of the newly formed Birmingham Museum and Art Gallery in 1885.

He received a knighthood in 1912, the first time the distinction had been bestowed on a provincial municipal officer.

Whitworth was a Member of the Council of The Birmingham & Midland Institute (1891–1927) and Honorary Secretary of the Institute (1902–1926). He was also a Trustee of Shakespeare's Birthplace and a member of the council of the National Art Collections Fund.

== Sources ==
- Reports of the Council of The Birmingham & Midland Institute (1890–1927)
- By the Gains of Industry – Birmingham Museums and Art Gallery 1885–1985, Stuart Davies, ISBN 0-7093-0131-6
- Obituary, The Herald, 22 January 1927.
