= Robert Hogarth Patterson =

Scottish journalist and author

Robert Hogarth Patterson (1821–1886) was a Scottish journalist and author.

== Early life ==
Born in Edinburgh in December 1821, Patterson was educated as a civil engineer at Edinburgh high school. When quite young he started in the printing-office of his cousin, John Ballantyne, as a press corrector. In 1852 he left the printing business to become editor of the Edinburgh Advertiser.

== London newspaper editor ==
In 1858 Patterson moved to London as editor, and later proprietor, of The Press, owned by Benjamin Disraeli, after the death in 1857 of David Trevena Coulton. George Henry Townsend took it over from him about 1865. About that year Patterson may have become involved with The Globe, which he ran at some point with Francis Mahony and E. B. Moran (or E. R. Morgan). A London evening paper, it took a Conservative line. The details, however are not clear. The editors of this period, during the 1860s, of The Globe included: Charles Wescomb; Henry Barnett, minister of South Place Chapel; Patterson; and Marbrook Tucker.

== Later life ==
Patterson resigned from The Globe in 1869, to join a board appointed by parliament to investigate and report on the purification of coal-gas in London. The outcome was a process for the elimination of sulphur and ammonia impurities from gas.

In 1872 Patterson went to Glasgow as editor of the Glasgow News, but his health broke down and he returned to London in 1874. He went on contributing articles, on politics, finance, science, and history, to periodicals. A reputed financial expert, he was consulted by both the Bank of England and the Bank of France on financial and currency questions, and was elected a fellow, and afterwards a member of council, of the Statistical Society. As a financial journalist he belonged to the generation of Hyde Clarke, David Morier Evans and William Newmarch, who debated abstract finance; their successors were Walter Bagehot, Arthur Crump, Arthur Ellis and Robert Giffen, concerned rather with realistic reporting on the City of London.

Patterson died at Hammersmith on 13 December 1886. He had married, in 1848, Georgina, daughter of Captain Thomson of Perth.

== Works ==
Patterson was the author of:

- The New Revolution; or the Napoleonic Policy in Europe, Edinburgh and London, 1860. A review in The Economist identified it as edited from published leaders and articles from The Press and Blackwood's Magazine; and as hostile to Napoleon III. It attracted attention, because of the fulfilment, soon after publication, of some of its predictions.
- Essays in History and Art, Edinburgh, 1862, reprinted from Blackwood's Magazine.
- The Economy of Capital; or Gold and Trade, Edinburgh, 1865. The work predicted a period of globalisation, in the form of greater commercial links between Europe and Asia driven by gold discoveries.
- The Science of Finance, Edinburgh, 1868.
- Railway Finance, Edinburgh, 1868.
- The State, the Poor, and the Country, including Suggestions on the Irish Question, Edinburgh, 1870.
- Gas and Lighting (British Manufacturing Industries series), London, 1876.
- The New Golden Age and the Influence of the Precious Metals upon the World, 2 vols., Edinburgh, 1882.

Patterson was also the author of pamphlets:

- Indian Politics: two essays on Self-Government in India and the Indian Land Question, 2 pts. 1864;
- Municipal Finance; the Gas and Water Supply of London, 1867;
- Gas Purification in London, including a Complete Solution of the Sulphur Question, Edinburgh, 1873, 2nd edit. 1874;
- Robespierre: a Lyrical Drama, 1877; and
- Light Theories: Suggestions for a New System of Cosmical Science.

In early life Patterson contributed articles to Chambers's Edinburgh Journal; and later he wrote for the Quarterly Review, Blackwood's Magazine, Bentley's Miscellany, and the Dublin University Magazine. His essay on aesthetics "On Real and Ideal Beauty" first appeared in Blackwood's, and was praised by William Angus Knight; it promoted the theories of David Ramsay Hay.

== Notes ==
Attribution

This article incorporates text from a publication now in the public domain: Lee, Sidney, ed. (1895). "Patterson, Robert Hogarth". Dictionary of National Biography. Vol. 44. London: Smith, Elder & Co.
