= William Bevan (priest) =

Welsh churchman

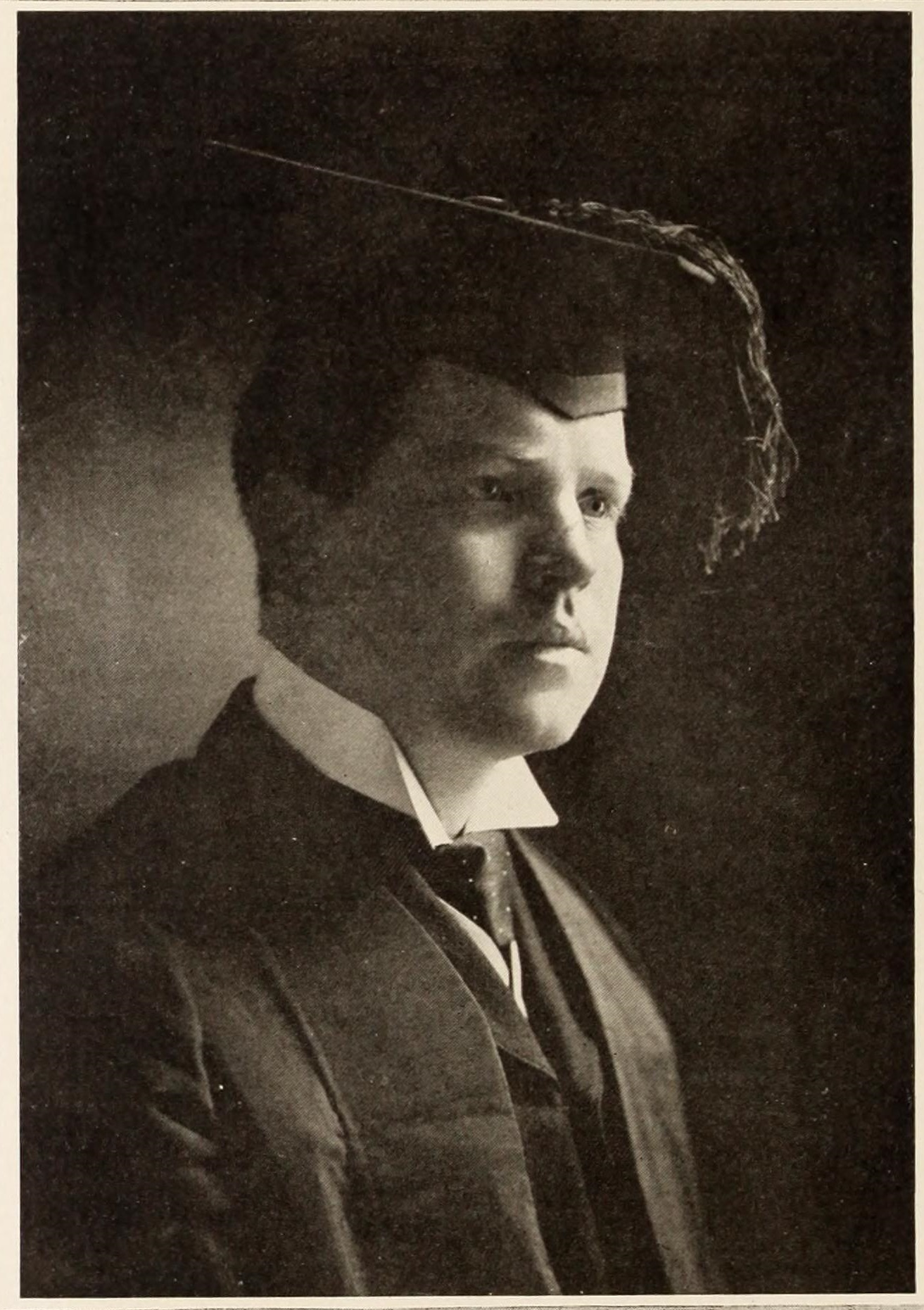
William Latham Bevan, Ph.D.

William Latham Bevan (1 May 1821 – 24 August 1908) was a Welsh churchman, archdeacon of Brecon from 1875.

== Life ==
He was born at Beaufort, Breconshire, the eldest of three sons of William Hibbs Bevan (1788–1846), then of Beaufort, but later of Glannant, Crickhowell (high sheriff for Breconshire 1841), by Margaret, daughter of Joseph Latham, also of Beaufort, but originally from Boughton-in-Furness. With a stepbrother, Edward Kendall, the father carried on the Beaufort Iron Works, trading as Kendall & Bevan, until 1833. The youngest brother, George Phillips Bevan (1829–1889) was known as a writer.

After Bevan's education at Rugby School under Dr. Thomas Arnold, he matriculated at Balliol College, Oxford, on 14 December 1838; but he almost immediately removed to Magdalen Hall, on being elected Lusby scholar there. He graduated B.A. in 1842, with a second class in the final classical school, and M.A. in 1845.

In 1844, Bevan was ordained deacon, and in 1845, after a short curacy at Stepney, he was admitted priest and presented to the living of Hay, Breconshire, by Sir Joseph Bailey, who was married to his mother's sister. This living had no parsonage. He held it for 56 years, a private income enabling him to contribute lto the restoration of the church, the erection of schools and of a town clock and tower, besides building a parish hall at his own expense. He was also prebendary of Llanddewi-Aberarth in St Davids Cathedral, 1876–9; canon residentiary of St Davids, 1879–93; archdeacon of Brecon from 1895 until 1907 (when at his resignation his son Edward Latham Bevan was appointed in his place); proctor for the Diocese of St Davids, 1880–95; examining chaplain to the bishop, 1881–97; and chaplain of Hay Union, 1850–95. He was offered, but declined, some deaneries. He was appointed Honorary Chaplain to the 3rd (Crickhowell) Brecknockshire Rifle Volunteer Corps on its formation in 1860, and continued in this role with its successor, the 1st (Brecknockshire) Volunteer Battalion, South Wales Borderers, until his resignation in 1907, when his son Edward (who had been an assistant chaplain to the unit since 1897) also took over.

On resigning the living of Hay in November 1901, Bevan retired to Ely Tower, Brecon, where he died on 24 August 1908; he was buried at Hay, where his widow, who died on 23 October 1909, was also buried. He was commemorated in Hay Church by carved oak choir stalls and a marble chancel pavement, given by his family in August 1910. The St Davids diocesan conference in 1908 resolved on founding a diocesan memorial to him.

== Works ==
Bevan is best known for pamphlets, essays and sermons in defence of the Welsh Church, which included 'The Church Defence Handy Volume' (1892) and 'Notes on the Church in Wales' (1905). During the last twenty years of his life he was regarded as an authority on the history of the Welsh Church, on which his major work was History of St. David's in the SPCK series of diocesan histories (1888).

Besides contributing articles to William Smith's Dictionary of the Bible, Bevan was also author of works on ancient geography:

- A Manual (1852);
- A Student's Manual,' based on Smith's Dictionary of Greek and Roman Geography (1861);
- A Smaller Manual (1872); and
- A Student's Manual of Modern Geography, Mathematical, Physical and Descriptive (2 vols. 1868; 7th edit. 1884), which was translated into Italian and Japanese.

== Family ==
Bevan married on 19 June 1849, at Whitney Church, Herefordshire, Louisa, fourth daughter of Tomkyns Dew of Whitney Court, by whom he had three sons and four daughters.

Bevan was the maternal grandfather of the English Catholic historian Christopher Dawson.

== Notes ==
Attribution

This article incorporates text from a publication now in the public domain: Daniel Lleufer Thomas (1912). "Bevan, William Latham". In Lee, Sidney (ed.). Dictionary of National Biography (2nd supplement). Vol. 1. London: Smith, Elder & Co.
