= William Mattieu Williams =

English Science and Education writer

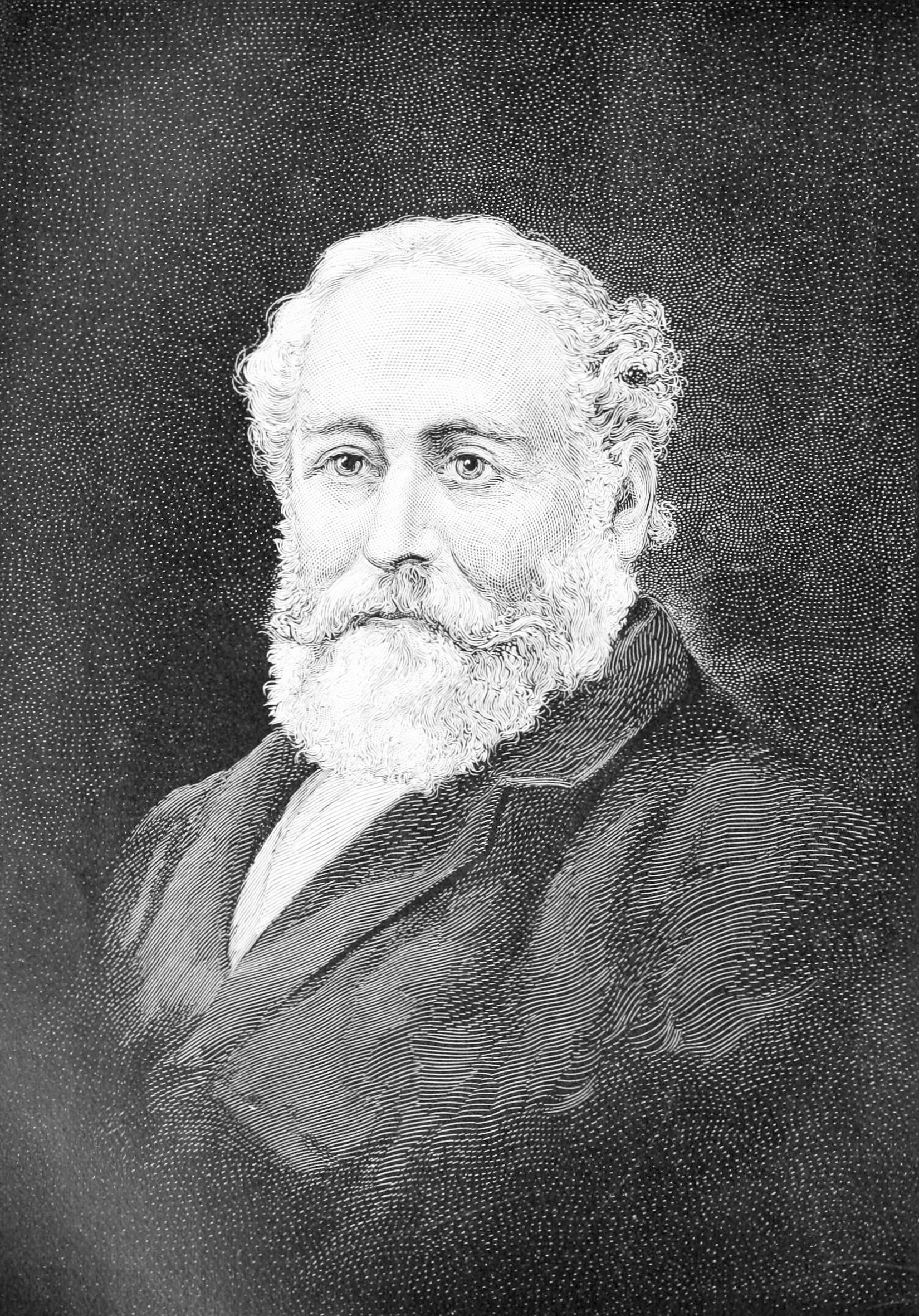
William Mattieu Williams

William Mattieu Williams (6 February 1820 – 28 November 1892) was an English writer on science and education.

== Life ==
The son of Abraham Williams, a fishmonger in London, and his wife Louise, daughter of Gabriel Mattieu, a Swiss refugee, he was born in London on 6 February 1820. He lost his father in infancy, and his mother married again when he was only four years old. After receiving and elementary education, he was apprenticed at the age of fourteen to Thomas Street, a mathematical and optical instrument maker in Lambeth. He attended evening classes at the London Mechanics' Institution in Southampton Buildings, Chancery Lane.

In 1841 he inherited a sum of money, and with his apprenticeship over, he passed two years at the University of Edinburgh, and a period on a walking tour through Europe, paying his way by working as an artisan. He spent time in Switzerland, Italy, Greece, and Turkey. On his return to England he went to Edinburgh to study medicine, but decided not to become a surgeon.

He set up as an electrical instrument maker and electrotyper in Hatton Garden, London.

== School and science lectures ==
He also lectured about his tour and on other subjects at the Mechanics' Institution, where he was a member of the committee of management. He helped to make the Institution accept William Ellis's offer of money to found a school, which, as the "Birkbeck School"’ was opened on 17 July 1848. The success of this school led George Combe, whom Williams knew from Edinburgh, with the monetary support of Ellis, to found a similar institution in Edinburgh; Williams undertook the headmastership, and it was opened on 4 December 1848 under the title of the ‘Williams Secular School’ in the Trades' Hall, Infirmary Street. Shortly it moved, after a rapid increase in its numbers, to the premises of the former anatomical school of Dr. Robert Knox at 1 Surgeons' Square.

In 1854, having been appointed master of the science classes in the recently opened Birmingham and Midland Institute, Williams moved there and delivered his opening lecture on 17 August 1854. In 1856 he introduced the successful "Institute penny lectures". In 1857 he became acquainted with Felice Orsini, and taught him something about manufacturing explosives, of interest to the Carbonari plotters. Later he turned his attention to the chemistry and manufacture of paraffin, and was appointed manager of the Leeswood Oil Company in 1863, when he left Birmingham for Caergwrle, Flintshire. After the decline of the Welsh oil-distilling industry following the discovery of oil fields in the USA, Williams went in 1868 to Sheffield as chemist to the Atlas Iron Works of Sir John Brown & Co.

In 1870 Williams moved to London, and devoted his time to scientific writing. He delivered the Cantor lectures in 1876, taking for his subject ‘Iron and Steel Manufacture,’ and again in 1878, when he spoke on ‘Mathematical Instruments.’ On the death of his stepfather's brother, Zachariah Watkins, early in 1889, he came into money, and began at the age of sixty-nine what he described as his life-work, the Vindication of Phrenology. While revising the completed manuscript he died suddenly at his residence, The Grange, Neasden, on 28 November 1892. He was buried at West Norwood Cemetery.

== Works ==
Williams was elected a fellow of the Chemical Society on 18 May 1857, and of the Royal Astronomical Society on 14 June 1872. He was author of:

- Who should teach Christianity to Children? Edinburgh, 1853.
- Through Norway with a Knapsack, London, 1859, 2 edits.; new edit. 1876.
- A Vindication of Garibaldi, London, 1862.
- The Intellectual Destiny of the Working Man, Birmingham, 1863,
- Shorthand for Everybody, London, 1867.
- The Fuel of the Sun, London, 1870.
- Through Norway with Ladies, London, 1877.
- A Simple Treatise on Heat, London, 1880.
- Science in Short Chapters, London, 1882.
- The Science of Cookery, London, 1884, for the International Health Exhibition.
- The Chemistry of Cookery, London, 1885.
- The Chemistry of Iron and Steel Making, London, 1890.
- The Philosophy of Clothing, London, 1890.
- A Vindication of Phrenology, London, 1894.

He edited Mrs. R. B. Taylor's A B C of Chemistry in 1873, and wrote articles on "Iron and Steel", "Explosive Compounds", and "Oils and Candles" for G. Phillips Bevan's British Manufacturing Industries series in 1876. He also contributed the "Science Notes" to the Gentleman's Magazine from 1880 to 1889, and dozens papers on scientific subjects to learned journals.

== Family ==
On 21 December 1859 he married Alice, eldest daughter of Joseph Baker, surveyor, of Birmingham.
