= James Daichendt =

G. James Daichendt
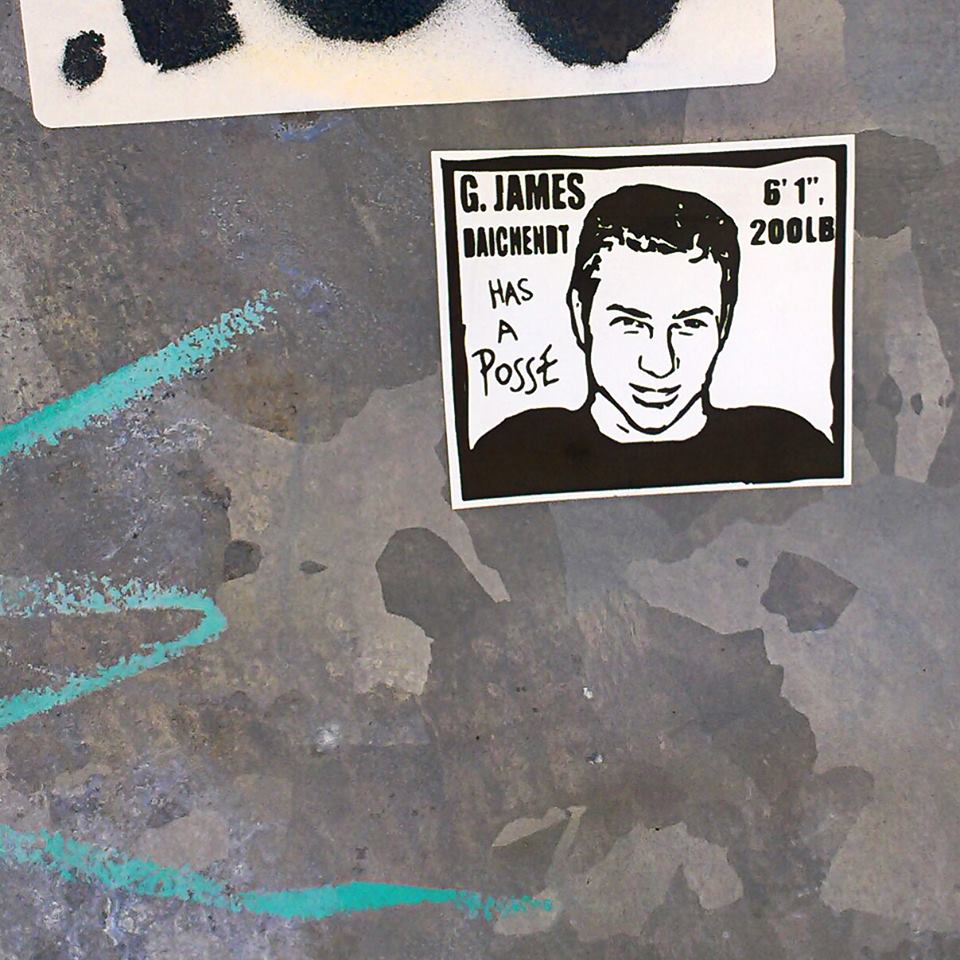
- Sticker from "Shepard Fairey Inc."
- Born: Gary James Daichendt Jr. November 22, 1975 (age 50); Youngstown, Ohio, US
- Education: Doctorate
- Alma mater: Columbia University
- Occupations: Professor, Author, Art critic
- Writing career
- Notable works: Shepard Fairey Inc. Artist * Professional * Vandal, Stay Up! Los Angeles Street Art

G. James Daichendt (born 1975) is an art critic and Professor of Art History. He serves as the Provost & Chief Academic Officer at Point Loma Nazarene University in Southern California. He has also taught at Boston University and Azusa Pacific University.

Daichendt founded and is the Principal Editor for the academic journal "Visual Inquiry: Learning and Teaching Art." He has written six books. The most recent are texts about the artists Kenny Scharf "In Absence of Myth" and Shepard Fairey "Shepard Fairey Inc. Artist/Professional/Vandal." His text Stay Up! Los Angeles Street Art earned him the title Professor Street Art. He has also received academic attention for his texts Artist Scholar: Reflections on Writing and Research and Artist-Teacher: A Philosophy for Creating and Teaching. Daichendt lectures regularly on the subject of art education and street art. He has authored biographies on artists Robbie Conal and Kenny Scharf.

Daichend lives in California with his wife and three children.

== Education ==
- BA, 1998, Azusa Pacific University
- MFA 2002, Boston University
- EdM 2003, Harvard University
- EdD 2009, Columbia University

== Books ==
- Robbie Conal: The Life of a Guerrilla Artist (forthcoming)
- The Urban Canvas: Street Art Around the World (2017)
- Kenny Scharf: In Absence of Myth (2016)
- Shepard Fairey Inc. Artist/Professional/Vandal (2013)
- Stay Up! Los Angeles Street Art (2012)
- Artist Teacher: A Philosophy for Creating and Teaching (2011)
- Artist Scholar: Reflections on Writing and Research (2010)

== Catalog essays ==
- Performing Research (2017). Los Angeles, CA: Fellows of Contemporary Art
- Becoming Loco (2017). Manhattan Beach Art Center
- British Invasion (2016). Lancaster, CA: Museum of Art and History.
- An Introduction to Post-Future: Art as a Sign and Symbol, An Interview with John Van Hamersveld (2016). Manhattan Beach Art Center.
- Servant to Infinite Distraction with Desire Obtain Cherish (2016). New York, NY: UNIX Gallery.
- Justin Bower: A Fractured Self (2016). Lancaster, CA: Museum of Art and History.
- Enterprising Street art from Outside/In (2015). Pasadena, CA: Art Center College of Design.
- A New Era for Alex Couwenberg (2015). Azusa, CA: Azusa Pacific Arts Press.
- Pictures of Nothing Revisited (2014). La Verne, CA: University of La Verne.
- The Art of David Flores (2014). Azusa, CA: Azusa Pacific Arts Press & Cameron + Company.
- Tim Bavington: Poptivism (2014). Azusa, CA: Azusa Pacific Arts Press.
- Lynn Aldrich: Un/common objects (2013). Pasadena, CA: Art Center College of Design.
- Late Confessions: How and Nosm (2013). New York, NY: Jonathan LeVine Gallery.
- Embodied: A 10-Year retrospective of Kent Anderson Butler (2012). Pomona, CA: The W. Keith and Janet Kellogg University Art Gallery.
