= Diffuse interstellar bands =

Absorption features in astronomical spectra

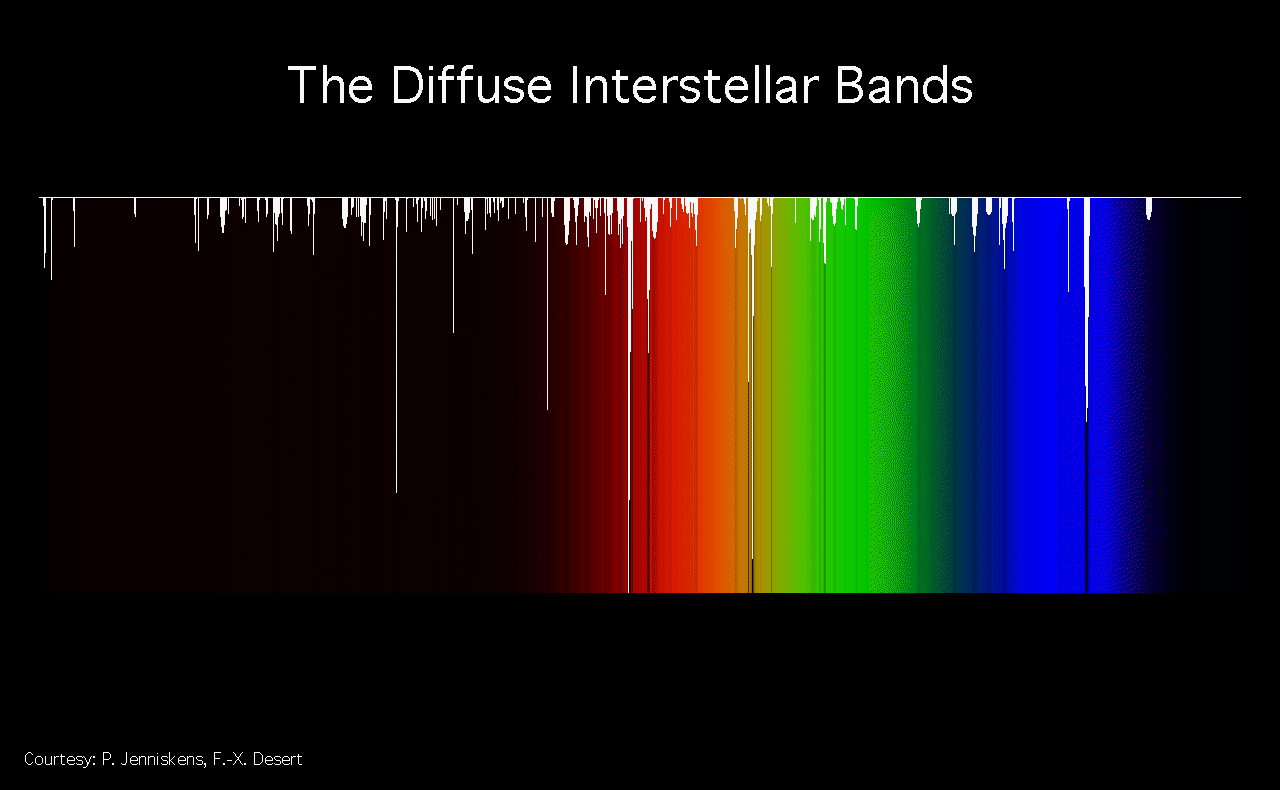
Relative strengths of observed diffuse interstellar bands

Diffuse interstellar bands (DIBs) are absorption features seen in the spectra of astronomical objects in the Milky Way and other galaxies. They are caused by the absorption of light by the interstellar medium. Circa 500 bands have now been seen, in ultraviolet, visible and infrared wavelengths.

The origin of most DIBs remains unknown, with common suggestions being polycyclic aromatic hydrocarbons and other large carbon-bearing molecules. Only one DIB carrier has been identified: ionised buckminsterfullerene (C_{60}^{+}), which is responsible for several DIBs in the near-infrared. The carriers of most DIBs remain unidentified.

== Discovery and history ==
Much astronomical work relies on the study of spectra - the light from astronomical objects dispersed using a prism or, more usually, a diffraction grating. A typical stellar spectrum will consist of a continuum, containing absorption lines, each of which is attributed to a particular atomic energy level transition in the atmosphere of the star.

The appearances of all astronomical objects are affected by extinction, the absorption and scattering of photons by the interstellar medium. Relevant to DIBs is interstellar absorption, which predominantly affects the whole spectrum in a continuous way, rather than causing absorption lines. In 1922, though, astronomer Mary Lea Heger first observed a number of line-like absorption features which seemed to be interstellar in origin.

Their interstellar nature was shown by the fact that the strength of the observed absorption was roughly proportional to the extinction, and that in objects with widely differing radial velocities the absorption bands were not affected by Doppler shifting, implying that the absorption was not occurring in or around the object concerned. The name diffuse interstellar band, or DIB for short, was coined to reflect the fact that the absorption features are much broader than the normal absorption lines seen in stellar spectra.

The first DIBs observed were those at wavelengths 578.0 and 579.7 nanometers (visible light corresponds to a wavelength range of 400 - 700 nanometers). Other strong DIBs are seen at 628.4, 661.4 and 443.0 nm. The 443.0 nm DIB is particularly broad at about 1.2 nm across - typical intrinsic stellar absorption features are 0.1 nm or less across.

Later spectroscopic studies at higher spectral resolution and sensitivity revealed more and more DIBs; a catalogue of them in 1975 contained 25 known DIBs, and a decade later the number known had more than doubled. The first detection-limited survey was published by Peter Jenniskens and Xavier Desert in 1994 (see Figure above), which led to the first conference on The Diffuse Interstellar Bands at the University of Colorado in Boulder on May 16–19, 1994. Today circa 500 have been detected.

In recent years, very high resolution spectrographs on the world's most powerful telescopes have been used to observe and analyse DIBs. Spectral resolutions of 0.005 nm are now routine using instruments at observatories such as the European Southern Observatory at Cerro Paranal, Chile, and the Anglo-Australian Observatory in Australia, and at these high resolutions, many DIBs are found to contain considerable sub-structure.

== The nature of the carriers ==
The great problem with DIBs, apparent from the earliest observations, was that their central wavelengths did not correspond with any known spectral lines of any ion or molecule, and so the material which was responsible for the absorption could not be identified. A large number of theories were advanced as the number of known DIBs grew, and determining the nature of the absorbing material (the 'carrier') became a crucial problem in astrophysics.

One important observational result is that the strengths of most DIBs are not strongly correlated with each other. This means that there must be many carriers, rather than one carrier responsible for all DIBs. Also significant is that the strength of DIBs is broadly correlated with the interstellar extinction. Extinction is caused by interstellar dust; however, DIBs, are not likely to be caused by dust grains.

The existence of sub-structure in DIBs supports the idea that they are caused by molecules. Substructure results from band heads in the rotational band contour and from isotope substitution. In a molecule containing, say, three carbon atoms, some of the carbon will be in the form of the carbon-13 isotope, so that while most molecules will contain three carbon-12 atoms, some will contain two ^{12}C atoms and one ^{13}C atom, much less will contain one ^{12}C and two ^{13}C, and a very small fraction will contain three ^{13}C molecules. Each of these forms of the molecule will create an absorption line at a slightly different rest wavelength.

The most likely candidate molecules for producing DIBs are thought to be large carbon-bearing molecules, which are common in the interstellar medium. Polycyclic aromatic hydrocarbons, long carbon-chain molecules such as polyynes, and fullerenes are all potentially important. These types of molecule experience rapid and efficient deactivation when excited by a photon, which both broadens the spectral lines and makes them stable enough to exist in the interstellar medium.

== Identification of C_{60}^{+} as a carrier ==
As of 2021 the only molecule confirmed to be a DIB carrier is the buckminsterfullerene ion, C_{60}^{+}. Soon after Harry Kroto discovered fullerenes in the 1980s, he proposed that they could be DIB carriers. Kroto pointed out that the ionised form C_{60}^{+} was more likely to survive in the diffuse interstellar medium. However, the lack of a reliable laboratory spectrum of gas-phase C_{60}^{+} made this proposal difficult to test.

In the early 1990s, laboratory spectra of C_{60}^{+} were obtained by embedding the molecule in solid ices, which showed strong bands in the near-infrared. In 1994, Bernard Foing and Pascale Ehrenfreund detected new DIBs with wavelengths close to those in the laboratory spectra, and argued that the difference was due to an offset between the gas-phase and solid-phase wavelengths. However, this conclusion was disputed by other researchers, such as Peter Jenniskens, on multiple spectroscopic and observational grounds.

A laboratory gas-phase spectrum of C_{60}^{+} was obtained in 2015 by a group led by John Maier. Their results matched the band wavelengths that had been observed by Foing and Ehrenfreund in 1994. Three weaker bands of C_{60}^{+} were found in interstellar spectra soon afterwards, resolving one of the earlier objections raised by Jenniskens. New objections were raised by other researchers, but by 2019 the C_{60}^{+} bands and their assignment had been confirmed by multiple groups of astronomers and laboratory chemists.

== See also ==
- List of interstellar and circumstellar molecules
