= George Herbert Townsend =

George Herbert Townsend (15 January 1787 – 23 February 1869) was an English literary compiler and journalist, who wrote several books that are of value in a study of his period.

Townsend was born in Bermondsey, Surrey, England to John and Cordelia Townsend. He was admitted a Freeman of the City of London.

His books include Russell's History of Modern Europe epitomised (1857), Shakespeare not an Impostor (1857), The Manual of Dates (1862), Men of the Time (1868), The Handbook of the Year 1868 (1869) and The Every-day Book of Modern Literature (1870).

Between 1860 and 1866 Townsend wrote several pamphlets containing selections of madrigals and glees for John "Paddy" Green, the proprietor of Evans's music and supper rooms, 43 Covent Garden. He wrote a Summary of Persian History, included as a preface to a book on Outram and Havelock's Persian Campaign and published in 1858.

During the elections of 1868 he was an active supporter of the Conservative party led by Benjamin Disraeli, and was promised a position in reward. However, the government resigned before this promise could be kept. Deeply disappointed, Townsend committed suicide at Kennington.

== Bibliography ==
- George Herbert Townsend (1857). Russell's History of Modern Europe epitomised. London: G. Routledge.
- George Herbert Townsend (1857). Shakespeare not an Impostor. London: G. Routledge & Co.
- George Herbert Townsend (1862). The Manual of Dates. London: Frederick Warne & Co.
  - George Herbert Townsend (1867), A Manual of Dates (2nd ed.), London: Frederick Warne & Co.
  - George Henry Townsend; Frederick Martin (1877), A Manual of Dates (5th ed.), London: Frederick Warne & Co.
- George Herbert Townsend, ed. (1868). Men of the Time. London: George Routledge and sons.
- George Herbert Townsend (1869). The Handbook of the Year 1868. London: Wyman & Sons.
- George Herbert Townsend (1870). The Every-day Book of Modern Literature. London: F. Warne.
