= Sandy Millar =

Anglican bishop

The Right Reverend Sandy Millar
- Honorary Assistant Bishop, Diocese of Ipswich and St. Edmundsbury
- Church: Church of England; Church of Uganda
- Appointed: 2012
- Other posts: Vicar, Holy Trinity Brompton (1985–2005); Honorary assistant bishop, Diocese of London (2006–2011)

Orders
- Ordination: 1977 (priesthood); 1976 (diaconate)
- Consecration: 25 November 2005 by Henry Luke Orombi

Personal details
- Born: 13 November 1939 (age 86)
- Denomination: Anglicanism
- Profession: Barrister, Anglican priest
- Education: Trinity College, Cambridge; University of Durham

John Alexander Kirkpatrick Millar (born 13 November 1939), known as Sandy Millar, is a retired Anglican bishop who, on 27 November 2005, was consecrated in Kampala as an assistant bishop in the Province of Uganda, in a joint initiative of Henry Luke Orombi, Archbishop of Uganda; Rowan Williams, Archbishop of Canterbury; and Richard Chartres, Bishop of London. He was subsequently licensed at St Paul's Cathedral, London, on 9 February 2006 to act as an honorary assistant bishop in the Diocese of London. He thereafter served as priest-in-charge of St Mark's, Tollington Park in North London until 2 February 2011 when he retired.

== Personal life ==
Millar was born into an upper class Scottish family. His father was a major-general. He was educated at Lambrook Preparatory School, Eton College and Trinity College, Cambridge, graduating in 1962 with the degree of Bachelor of Arts, promoted Master of Arts in 1966. He practised as a barrister for 10 years. After that, he gained a diploma in theology from the University of Durham. He was ordained deacon in 1976 and priest in 1977 at the age of 37.

Millar has been a prebendary of St Paul's Cathedral since 1997.

Millar is in the Charismatic Evangelical tradition of the Church of England, but has usually concentrated on local missions and not on participation in controversies in the wider Anglican Communion. However, in October 2007, he was reported to have said to an American church congregation at Truro Church, in Fairfax, Virginia that "there is a war on for the very soul of the church" and to have told the congregation, which had left the Episcopal Church of the United States in protest at its acceptance of homosexuality, "your steadfastness in the face of a new and speciously sophisticated manifestation of evil has won you many admirers all over the world." These comments were publicised on the internet, although not by him.

On 29 April 2012, Millar was licensed as an honorary assistant bishop in the Diocese of St Edmundsbury and Ipswich, by which time he was living in Aldeburgh.

== Growing the church ==
Millar was vicar of Holy Trinity Brompton from 1985 to 2005 and was the principal person responsible for the Alpha course. He was succeeded as vicar and principal of Alpha by Nicky Gumbel. During this period, he developed a strategy of church planting throughout London, thereby making it possible for dying churches to have a fresh start with congregations and clergy provided by Holy Trinity – all in close association with the London bishops. Such church "plants" included:

- 1985: St Barnabas' Addison Road, West Kensington
- 1987: St Mark's Battersea Rise
- 1989: St Paul's Onslow Square
- 1994: St Stephen's Church, Westbourne Park
- 2000: St Paul's, Hammersmith
- 2002: St George the Martyr's, Queen Square, Bloomsbury
- 2005: St Paul's Shadwell

Another of his achievements is the rehabilitation of the previously disused church of St Paul's, Onslow Square, located in his parish.

== Writing and teaching ==
Millar also initiated "The Marriage Course" and "The Marriage Preparation Course", which run both throughout the United Kingdom and in many other countries. In 2005, a book containing a selection of his writings, All I Want Is You, was published.

== Styles ==
- Sandy Millar (1939–1977)
- The Revd Sandy Millar (1977–1997)
- The Revd Prebendary Sandy Millar (1997–2005)
- The Rt Revd Sandy Millar (2005–present)

== See also ==
- Nicky Lee (priest)

Church of England titles
Preceded by John T. C. B. Collins	Vicar of Holy Trinity Brompton; 1985–2005	Succeeded by Nicky Gumbel
