= Mary Wemyss =

English novelist

Mary Constance Elphinstone Wemyss (née Lutyens; 14 January 1868 – 15 March 1951) was an English novelist who published her work under the name of Mrs George Wemyss.

== Early life ==
Wemyss was born in Kensington, Middlesex, one of the thirteen children of Captain Charles Henry Augustus Lutyens (1829–1915), a soldier and painter, and Mary Theresa Gallwey (c. 1832–1906) from Killarney, Ireland. She was baptised as Mary Constance Elphinstone on 20 February 1868 at St Paul's, Onslow Square, Kensington. The Lutyens family was then living at 16, Onslow Square.

The older sister of Edwin Lutyens, she grew up in Thursley, Surrey.

== Life and career ==
On 6 March 1890, at Holy Trinity Brompton, Knightsbridge, aged 22 and still living at 16, Onslow Square, Mary Lutyens married George Wemyss, a captain in the West Yorkshire Regiment, who gave his father's name as Frederick Augustus von Wachsmann. The Rev. H. W. Webb-Peploe, Vicar of St Paul's, Onslow Square, officiated. George Wemyss had been born in New Zealand.

Wemyss published at least twelve novels between 1910 and 1919. Already by 1914 her work was the subject of interest in the United States.

Reviewing her Oranges and Lemons in 1919, Punch noted

Mrs. George Wemyss has for some time past specialised in spinster-aunts, bachelor-uncles and charming nieces. In Oranges and Lemons she introduces us pleasantly to some more… Really, of course, none of the story much matters. But if you want the sensation of having stayed with delightful people in delightful places, where rising prices are not even mentioned or thought of, Mrs. Wemyss can give it you all the time.“

The New York Times also reviewed Oranges and Lemons, summing it up as “A CONVENTIONAL and mildly — very mildly — amusing little story”.

In 1939, at the outbreak of the Second World War, George and Mary Wemyss were living together near Stroud, Gloucestershire. He was a retired Major, while she was noted as having private means. In their household were a butler, a cook, a lady's maid, and two housemaids. George Wemyss died at home at Atcombe Court, Woodchester, Gloucestershire, in March 1944, leaving an estate valued at £22,920. His widow survived him until 15 March 1951, dying at 16, Albert Hall Mansions, Kensington. Probate on her estate valued it at £54,699.

== Bibliography ==
- All about All of Us (London: J.M. Dent & Co., 1901)
- The Professional Aunt, by Mrs George Wemyss (London: Constable, 1910)
- Things We Thought Of: told from a child's point of view (London: Constable & Co., 1911)
- Prudent Priscilla, by Mrs George Wemyss (1912; reprinted by Palala Press, 2016, ISBN 978-1357382735)
- A Lost Interest, by Mrs George Wemyss (London: Constable & Co., 1912, illustrated by Balliol Salmon; Toronto: McClelland and Goodchild, 1912)
- Grannie for Granted (London: Constable, 1914, ASIN B000YDTZR2)
- Jaunty in Charge, by Mrs George Wemyss (New York: E. P. Dutton & Company, 1915; reprinted by Forgotten Books (2018), ISBN 978-0483843646
- Petunia, by Mrs George Wemyss (1916; reprinted by Wentworth Press, 2019, ISBN 978-0469132139)
- Impossible People, by Mrs George Wemyss (London: Constable & Co., 1918)
- People of Popham, by Mrs George Wemyss (1919)
- Oranges and Lemons (1919)
- Tubby and the others (London: Blackie, 1935, for children ASIN B006GAURC4)
