= Hill House International Junior School =

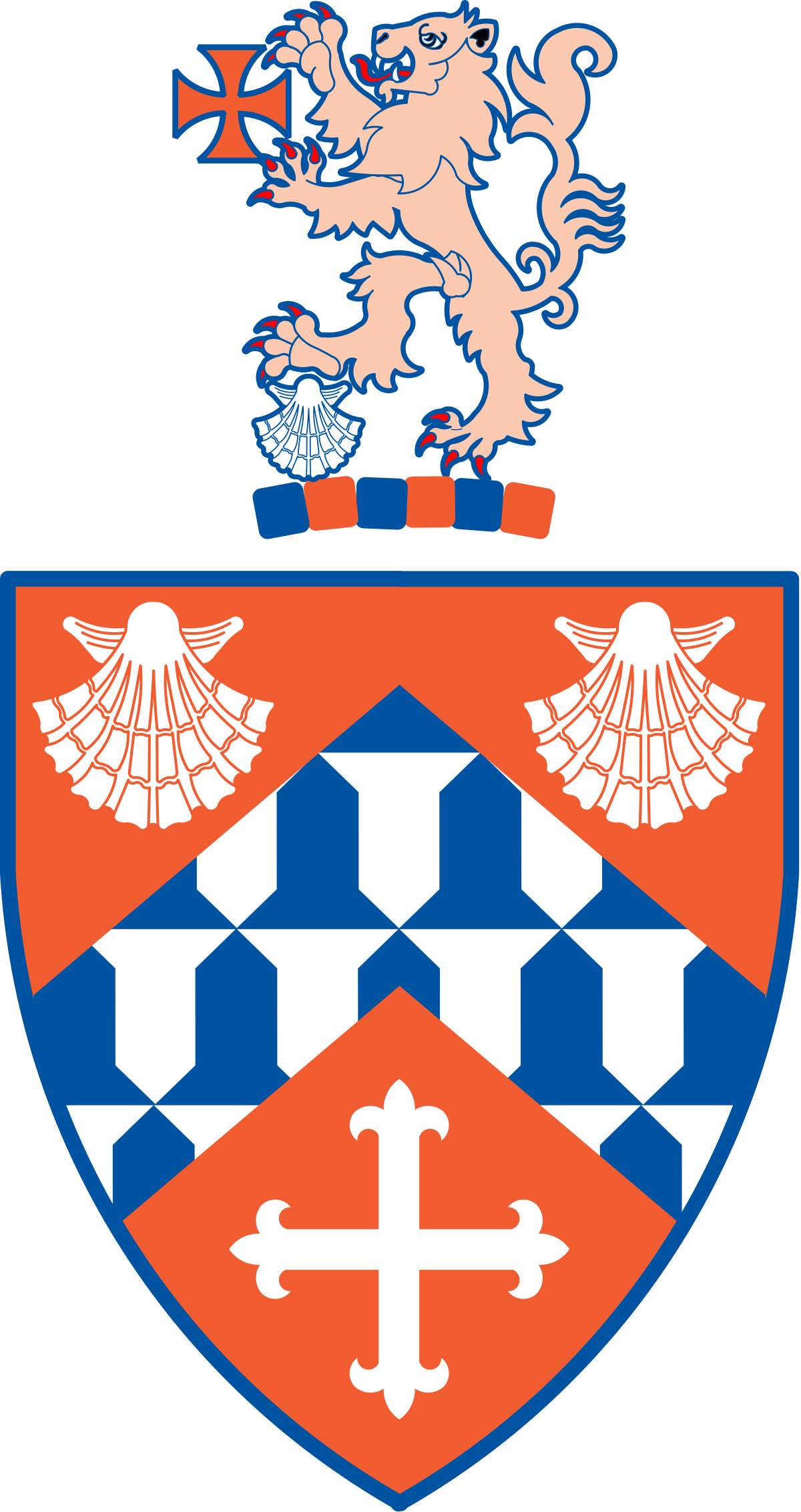
- Blazon of arms Arms: Gules, a chevron Vair between two escallops Argent in chief and a cross flory Argent in base. Crest: A lion rampant guardant Proper, armed and langued Gules, holding a cross pattée Gules and statant upon an escallop Argent.

Location
- 17 Hans Place; London, SW1X 0EP; England; 51°29′51″N 0°09′37″W

Information
- Type: Private preparatory school
- Motto: Latin: Semper vigilans (Always vigilant); English: "A child's mind is not a vessel to be filled but a fire to be kindled."
- Established: 1949 (La Tour-de-Peilz, Switzerland); 1951 (Knightsbridge, London, England)
- Founder: Lt-Col Stuart Townend
- Department for Education URN: 100518 Tables
- Headmaster: Edmund Townend
- Warden: Richard Townend
- Gender: Co-educational
- Age: 4 to 13
- Enrolment: approx. 460 (2025)
- Houses: Grammont (blue); Midi (red); Naye (green); Rosa (yellow)
- Colours: Old gold, rust & tan
- Annual tuition: £21,060 – £27,480
- Website: hillhouseschool.co.uk

Hill House International Junior School, known simply as Hill House, is a private, fee-paying primary school located primarily in the Knightsbridge district of London. Founded in 1949, it is a preparatory school. As of 2025, the school has approximately 450 pupils enrolled.

== Governance ==
Hill House is an independent school and is managed by the Townsend family.

The school has a compulsory uniform. Designed by Beatrice Townend, it is known to be distinct and eccentric. The uniform includes thick golden cable-knit jumpers, burgundy-coloured corduroy knickerbockers, cravats in the school colours and backpacks in British racing green.

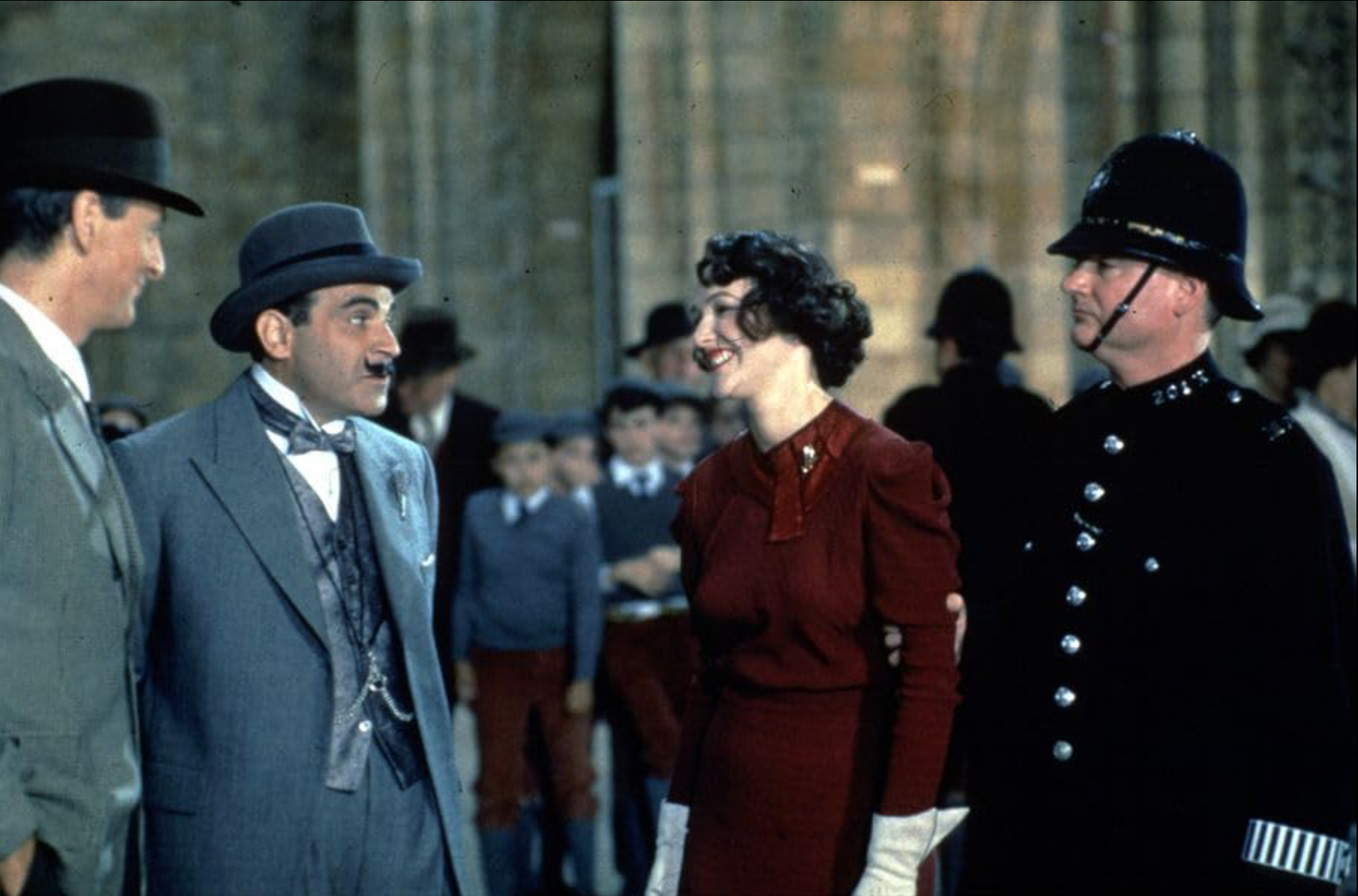
David Suchet (Poirot) and Hugh Fraser (Hastings) in the 14 January 1990 episode of Agatha Christie's Poirot; Hill House boys in the school’s famous burgundy knickerbockers are visible in the background

=== The Townend family ===
As of 2025, Hill House is the only London school “in which the day to day administration of every aspect of the school remains in the care and control of the founding family.”

Three generations of the Townend family have been headmasters of Hill House:

- Lt-Col Stuart Townend (Founding Headmaster 1949–2002)
- Richard Townend, son of Stuart Townend (Headmaster 2002–2022; Warden 2022–present)
- Edmund Townend, younger son of Richard Townend (Headmaster 2022–present)

The title of Warden of the school was created for Richard Townend upon his retirement from the role of headmaster in 2022. His elder son, William Townend, is the school’s Bursar.

== History ==
Hill House was originally founded in September 1949 at La Tour-de-Peilz in Canton Vaud, Switzerland by Lieutenant-Colonel Stuart Townend, an athlete and Liberal Party politician, along with his wife, Beatrice. The original schoolhouse was called "La Colline", French for “the hill”, hence Hill House. The first London branch was established in 1951, which soon became its centre, expanding to four buildings total across Kensington and Chelsea. By 1960, the Swiss branch had moved twice within Canton Vaud to settle at a chalet in Glion, overlooking Lake Geneva. In 1966, a new schoolhouse at Glion was purpose-built by Lt-Col Townend, and today is used as a boarding house for trips abroad.

In his lifetime, Lt-Col Townend, dubbed simply "the Colonel", chose his pupils solely on the basis of his approval of their mothers.

== Campus ==
The school maintains four premises in London, the main one being in Hans Place, along with a boarding house in Glion, Canton Vaud in Switzerland.

== Hill House in media ==
The school was outlined on page 74, chapter 3.1 ("Learning to be Sloane: Sloane Education"), of Peter York's and Ann Barr's 1982 guide book The Official Sloane Ranger Handbook as an appropriate calibre of school on the "third rung of the ladder" of a "Sloane boy's" education: describing it, amongst other things, as "Prince Charles's old school. Outdoorsy, musical, for energetic extroverts."

On 22 February 1989, headmaster Stuart Townend appeared on Season 9 Episode 22 of Wogan, alongside Desert Island Discs presenter Sue Lawley and future Labour Party Home and Foreign Secretary Jack Straw. Hill House was also featured in the 23 February 1989 documentary episode "Knickerbockers in Knightsbridge", part of the ninth season of the BBC series 40 Minutes, in which school life under “Colonel” Townend is narrated.

== Notable alumni ==
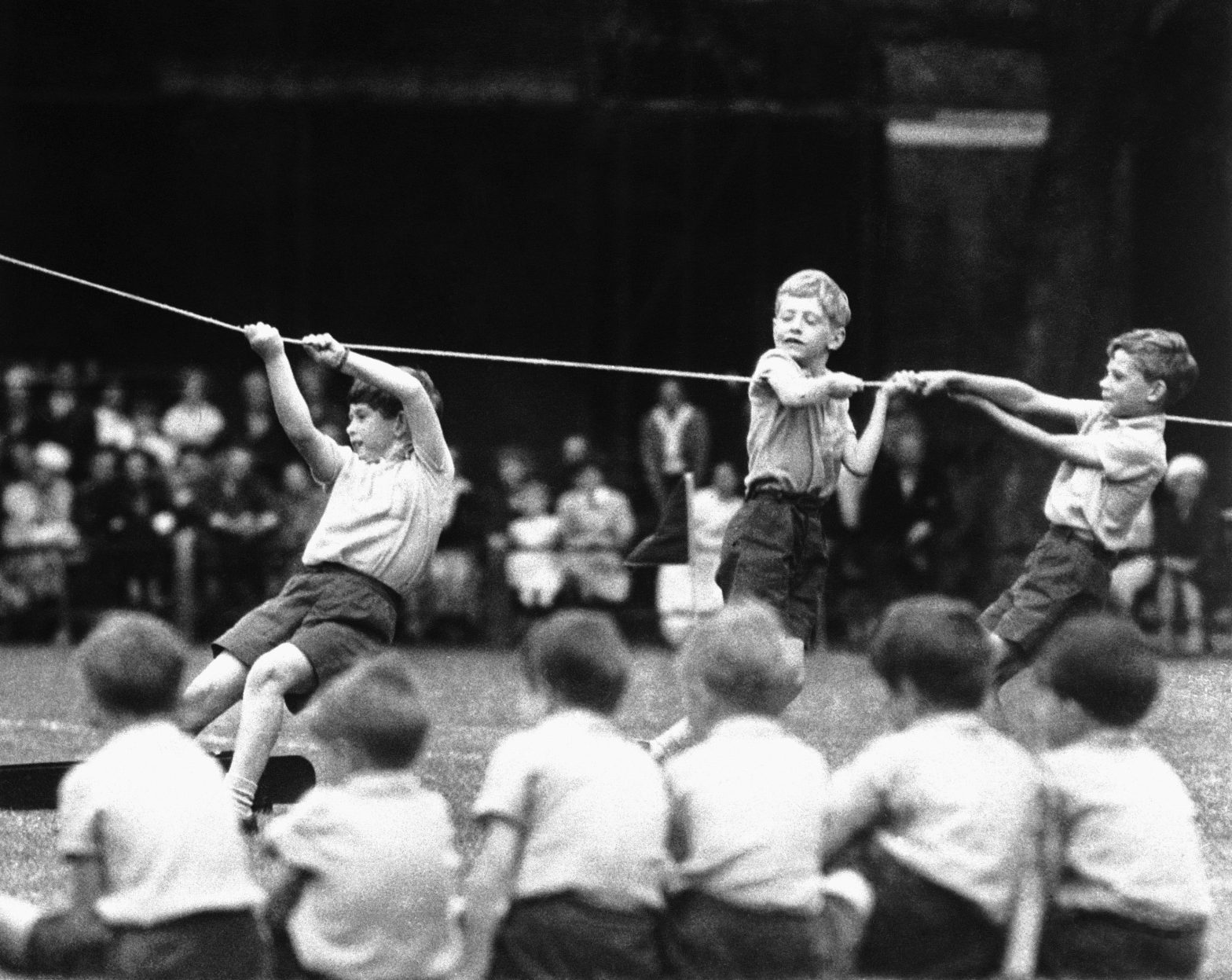
The then Prince Charles, center left, takes part in a sports day at Hill House School, in London, July 8, 1957

=== Arts and media ===
- Lily Allen, singer-songwriter
- Rupert Degas, actor
- Sofia Ellar, singer-songwriter
- Peaches Geldof, columnist, television personality, model, and daughter of singer-songwriter Bob Geldof
- Pixie Geldof, model, singer, and daughter of singer-songwriter Bob Geldof
- Anya Taylor-Joy, actress
- Nick Watt, BBC Newsnight political editor
- Mark-Francis Vandelli, television personality most known for his role in Made in Chelsea
- Yasmine Naghdi, Principal ballerina of The Royal Ballet

=== Politics ===
- Ian Macpherson, 3rd Baron Strathcarron, Conservative Peer
- Sir Jacob Rees-Mogg, Conservative Member of Parliament (MP), former Leader of the House of Commons

=== Other ===
- Charles III, King of the United Kingdom - it was first time that an heir to the British throne had been to a civilian school, prior to that princes were educated either by tutors or at a military or naval academy such as Osborne.
- Nicky Gumbel, Vicar of Holy Trinity Brompton Church (2005—2022) and a major developer of the international Christian-themed Alpha Course

== See also ==
- List of schools in the Royal Borough of Kensington and Chelsea
