= St Augustine's, Queen's Gate =

St Augustine's Church
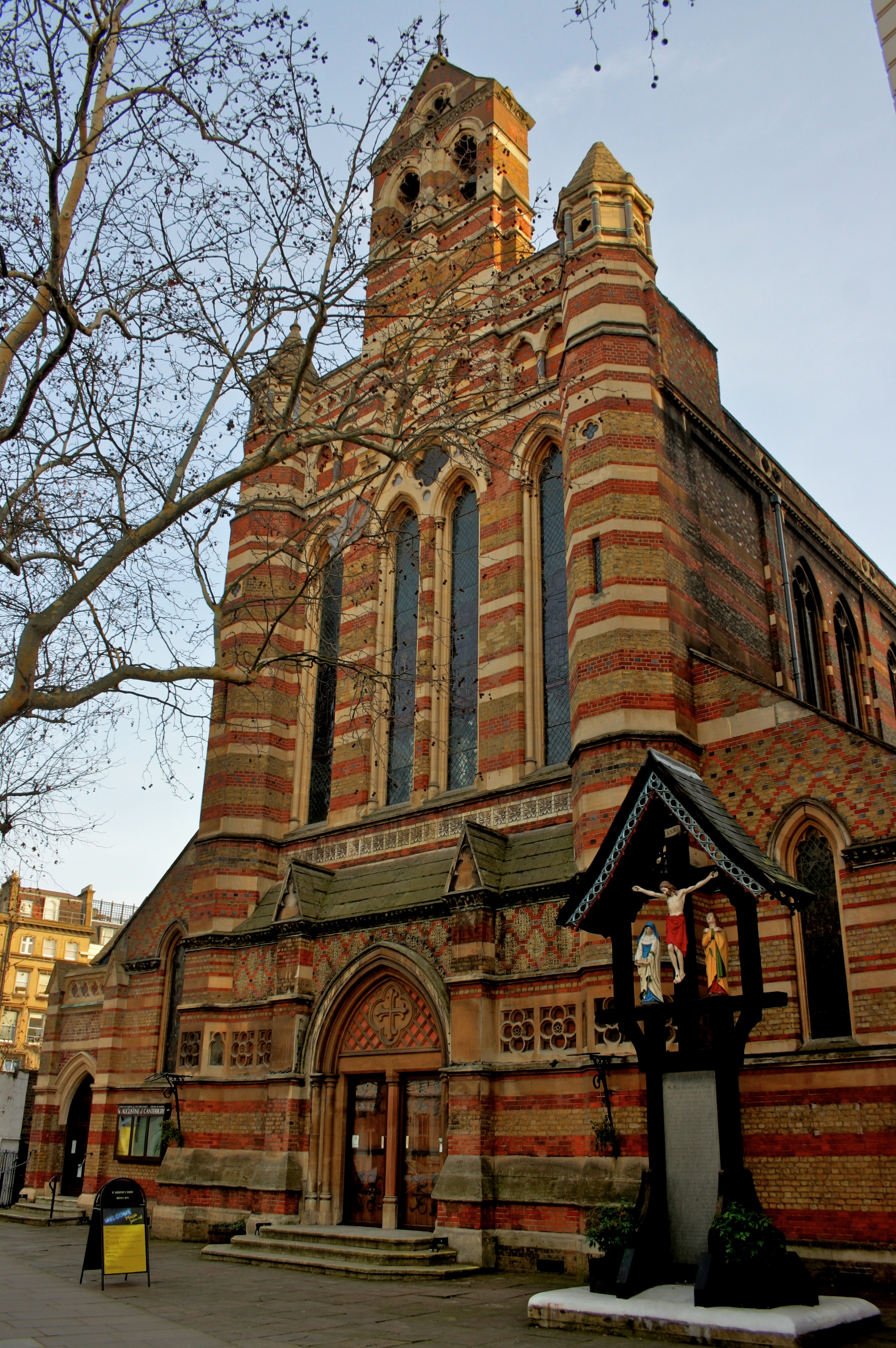
- St Augustine's Church
- 51.4933°N 0.1780°W
- Location: Queen's Gate, Brompton, London
- Country: England
- Denomination: Church of England
- Churchmanship: Anglo-Catholic

History
- Dedicated: 1876

Architecture
- Architect: William Butterfield
- Years built: 1865

Administration
- Diocese: Diocese of London
- Archdeaconry: Archdeaconry of Middlesex
- Deanery: Chelsea Deanary
- Parish: Holy Trinity w St Paul, Onslow Sq and St Augustine, Sth Kensington

Clergy
- Vicar: The Revd Nicky Gumbel
- Priest: The Revd Tom Jackson MBE

St Augustine's, Queen's Gate, is a Grade II* listed Anglican church in Queen's Gate, Brompton, London, England. The church was built in 1865, and the architect was William Butterfield.

== History ==
In 1865 the curate of Holy Trinity, Brompton, the Reverend R. R. Chope, had a temporary iron church put up in his garden off Gloucester Road, and there he would conduct services which, for one writer of the time, were "the nearest approach to Romanism we have witnessed in an Anglican church … if indeed it be not very Popery itself under the thinnest guise of the Protestant name". Finding the temporary church inadequate, a group of influential members of his congregation approached the Church Commissioners later that year with a request for the formation of a new parish in South Kensington to be known as St Augustine's. They offered a 'benefaction' of £100 per annum, stipulating that the first incumbent should be Mr Chope.

As there was no shortage of churches in the neighbourhood, the Bishop of London, A. C. Tait, objected strongly to the proposal and it was not until after he became Archbishop of Canterbury in 1868 that a site was purchased and the new parish formed. It was a difficult site, for although plans had been formulated to extend Queen's Gate to Old Brompton Road, at this time the road went no further than the crossing of Harrington Road. Access to the site had to be made through what is today Reece Mews, and the church plan was aligned with this. This accounts for the strange angle the church presents today in relation to Queen's Gate.

William Butterfield was appointed architect, and the estimated cost of his plan was £18,000. As there was not enough money, it was proposed to build the church in two stages. The nave and aisles were ready for services in 1871. The chancel and sanctuary were completed in 1876. The seating capacity was for 853 people. Gerald Hocken Knight was organist of St Augustine's from 1931 to 1937.

=== Present day ===
In 2010, St Augustine's was joined with the neighbouring parish of Holy Trinity Brompton (HTB). It was fully absorbed into its parish in March 2011, with the parish being renamed "Holy Trinity w St Paul, Onslow Sq and St Augustine, Sth Kensington". Unusually, given that HTB is a charismatic evangelical Anglican church, St Augustine's has "kept its Sung Eucharist, vestments and incense". It stands within the Modern Catholic tradition of the Church of England.

The Revd Paul Cowley, a curate of HTB was assigned to St Augustine's as its 'pastor'. He had no previous experience of High Church Anglicanism, having trained for ordination at Oak Hill College (a conservative evangelical theological college) and served as a minister of HTB (a charismatic evangelical church). Though he learnt the High Mass that was the main service of St Augustine's, he made a number of changes: a faculty was obtained to remove the pews and replace them with chairs but original pews as agreed with English Heritage are clearly on display in various parts of the building. Clergy from HTB wear albs and coloured stoles appropriate to the liturgical seasons to celebrate the weekly 11 am Sung Eucharist. There is also a service of Holy Communion at 9 am . A more informal, evening service was also introduced though this now takes place at St Paul's, Onslow Square. In November 2018 the Revd Tom Jackson took over from Revd Paul Cowley.
