= Nicky Gumbel =

English Anglican priest (born 1955)

The Reverend Nicky Gumbel CBE
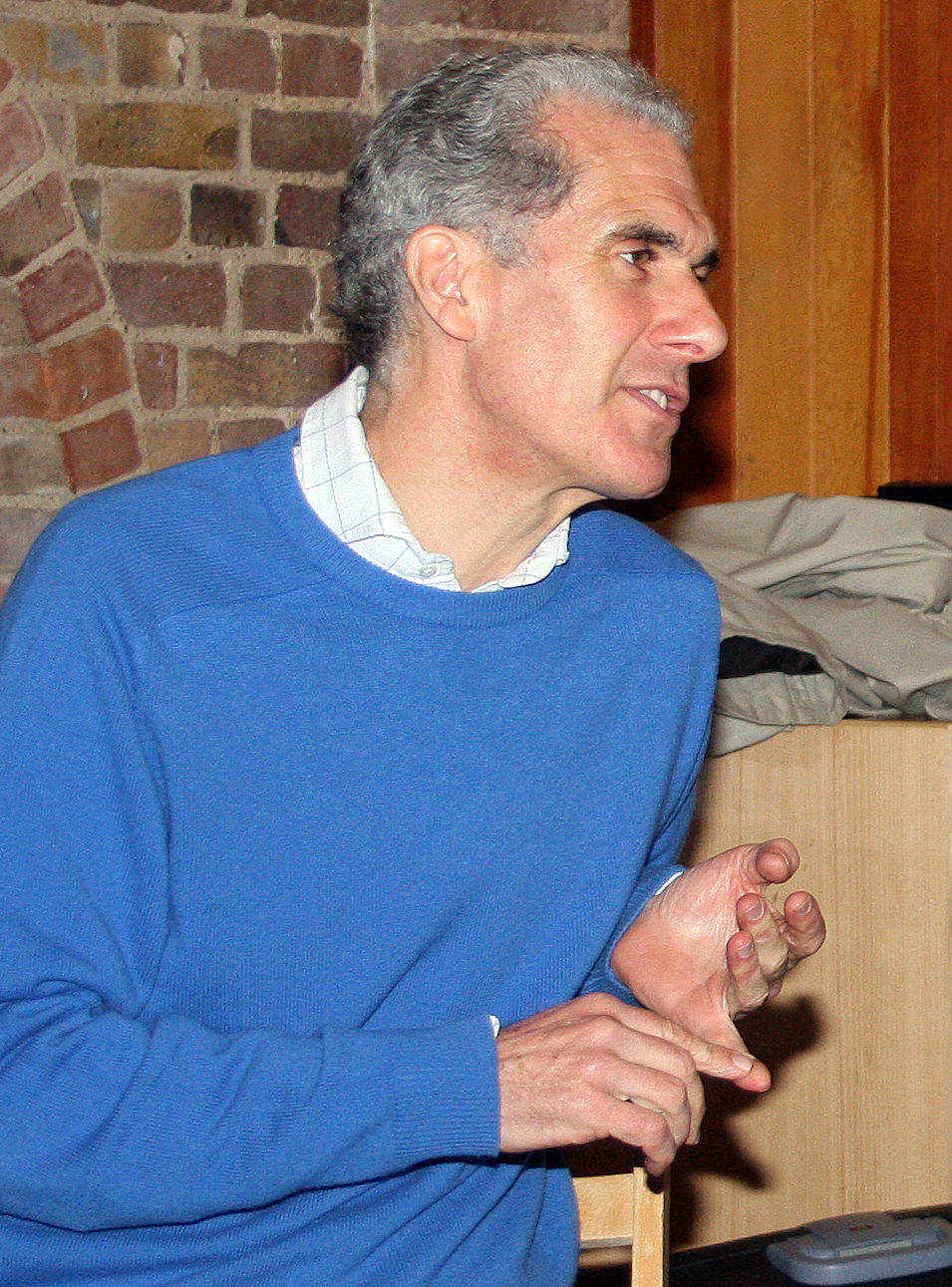
- Gumbel in 2009
- Born: Nicholas Glyn Paul Gumbel; 28 April 1955 (age 71); London, England
- Education: Hill House School; Eton College; Trinity College, Cambridge; Wycliffe Hall, Oxford
- Occupations: Priest, author, barrister
- Spouse: Pippa (m. 1978)
- Children: 3

Ecclesiastical career
- Religion: Christianity (Anglican)
- Church: Church of England
- Ordained: 1986 (deacon); 1987 (priest)
- Offices held: Curate of Holy Trinity Brompton (1986–2005); Vicar of Holy Trinity Brompton (2005–2022)

Nicholas Glyn Paul Gumbel is an English Anglican priest and author in the evangelical and charismatic traditions. He is known as the developer of the Alpha Course, a basic introduction to Christianity supported by churches of many Christian traditions. He was vicar of Holy Trinity Brompton in the Diocese of London (Church of England) from 2005 to 2022.

== Early life and education ==
Nicky Gumbel was born on 28 April 1955 in London, England. He is the son of Walter Gumbel, a German secular Jew from Stuttgart whose licence to practise law in that city was withdrawn in one of the early Nazi purges. Walter Gumbel emigrated to Britain and became a successful barrister. Gumbel's mother, Muriel Gumbel, was also a barrister and nominal Christian.

Gumbel was educated at Hill House School, an independent day preparatory school in Knightsbridge in London, followed by Eton College, an independent boys' boarding school near Windsor in Berkshire. He studied law at Trinity College, Cambridge, graduating with a Bachelor of Arts (BA) degree in 1976; in accordance with the university's tradition, his BA degree was later promoted to a Master of Arts (MA) degree.

He converted to Christianity while attending university in 1974. Gumbel also attended the Iwerne holiday camps founded by EJ "Bash" Nash; these were evangelical Christian holiday camps aimed at children from English public schools, designed to prepare boys for future ministry at the highest level in the church. After revelations of sexual and physical abuse perpetrated by John Smyth at these camps, Gumbel gradually distanced himself from Iwerne, and in later editions of his 2011 book Bible in One Year, replaced the eulogy to Nash with the same eulogy addressed to John Collins.

== Life and career ==
After graduating from university, Gumbel followed in his father's footsteps and became a practising barrister. Meanwhile, he became a regular worshipper at Holy Trinity Brompton Church, Knightsbridge. In January 1978, Gumbel married at the church and he would go on to have three children with his wife Pippa.

In 1982, Gumbel announced his decision to leave the bar to train for ordination in the Church of England. In 1983 he began theological studies and training for ordained ministry at Wycliffe Hall, Oxford. He graduated with a BA degree in 1986; as per tradition, his BA degree was later promoted to an MA degree.

== Ordained ministry ==
Gumbel was ordained in the Church of England as a deacon in 1986. After some difficulty in finding a curacy, he joined the staff of his "home" church of Holy Trinity Brompton (HTB) in the Diocese of London. He was ordained as a priest in 1987. In 1996, the Bishop of London appointed him Alpha chaplain, though he remained at HTB as a curate. In 2005, Gumbel was officially installed as vicar of Holy Trinity Brompton Church. The previous vicar, Sandy Millar, had retired from stipendiary ministry and became an assistant bishop in the Diocese of London.

In 2007, Gumbel was awarded an honorary doctorate by the University of Gloucestershire as recognition of his broad contribution to the wider church through Alpha.

He was appointed Commander of the Order of the British Empire (CBE) in the 2024 New Year Honours for services to the Church of England.

=== Alpha Course ===
In 1990, Gumbel took over the leadership of the Alpha Course, which had been running there since 1977. The course was transformed under his leadership from being one designed for new Christians to one primarily for those outside the church who would not consider themselves Christians. Gumbel serves as the public face of the course, being described by James Heard as something of a "Weberian charismatic leader".

Gumbel is the author of a number of books related to the Alpha Course, including Questions of Life, which has sold over 1,000,000 copies. Voted "Christian Book of the Year" in 1994, it has been published in 48 languages. Other related books include Why Jesus, Searching Issues, Telling Others, A Life Worth Living, Challenging Lifestyle, Heart of Revival, and 30 Days.

== See also ==
- Evangelical Anglicanism
- Nicky Lee (priest)
- Low church
- Toronto Blessing

Church of England titles
Preceded by Sandy Millar	Vicar of Holy Trinity Brompton; 2005–2022	Succeeded by Archie Coates
