= Stuart Townend =

Stuart Townend may refer to:

- Stuart Townend (headmaster) (1909–2002), British athlete, soldier and school headmaster
- Stuart Townend (musician) (born 1963), English hymnwriter and worship leader
