= South Kensington =

District in London, England

Coordinates: 51.4912°N 0.1769°W

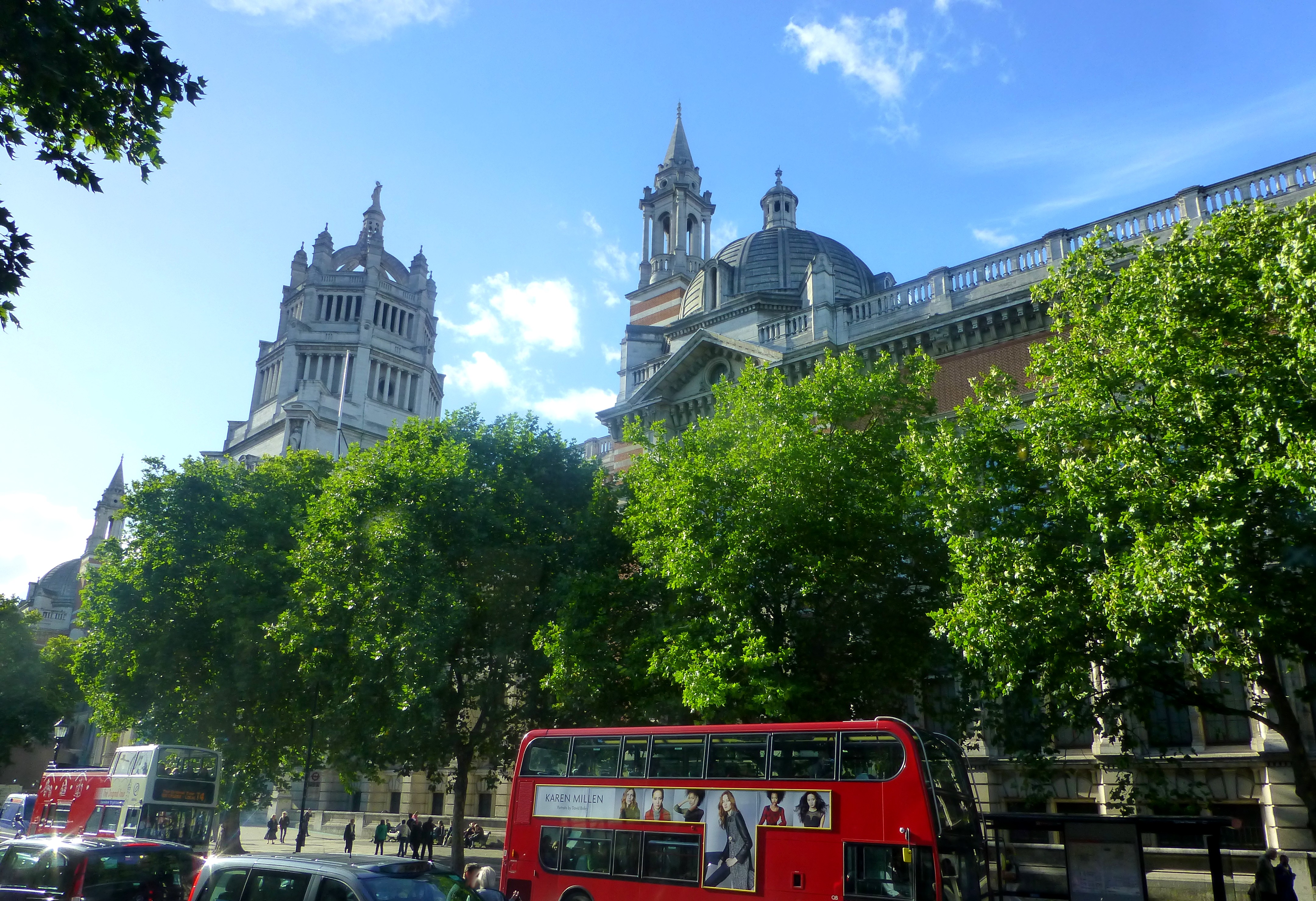
- V&A Museum, South Kensington

- Location within Greater London
- OS grid reference: TQ265785
- London borough: Kensington & Chelsea; Westminster
- Ceremonial county: Greater London
- Region: London
- Country: England
- Sovereign state: United Kingdom
- Post town: LONDON
- Postcode district: SW7
- Dialling code: 020
- Police: Metropolitan
- Fire: London
- Ambulance: London
- UK Parliament: Kensington and Bayswater; Cities of London and Westminster
- London Assembly: West Central

South Kensington is a district at the West End of Central London in the Royal Borough of Kensington and Chelsea. Historically it settled on part of the scattered Middlesex village of Brompton. Its name was supplanted with the advent of the railways in the late 19th century and the opening (and shutting) and naming of local tube stations. It is home to several well-known museums and cultural landmarks such as the Natural History Museum, the Science Museum, the Victoria and Albert Museum, and Imperial College London.

== History ==
Following the 1851 Great Exhibition in Hyde Park, an 87-acre (35 ha) area, west of what is now Exhibition Road, was purchased by the commissioners of the exhibition, in order to create a base for institutions dedicated to the arts and sciences, leading to the foundation of the Royal Albert Hall, three museums, the Royal School of Mines later a world renowned technological university, the Royal College of Music and the Royal College of Organists there. The market gardens of the rural area began to make way for a series of hospitals, such as the Brompton Hospital and the New Cancer Hospital along nearby Fulham Road. Adjacent landowners began to develop the land in the 1860s as a result of the transport hub and the general urbanisation boom west of London, and led to the eventual absorption of Brompton and its station into Kensington. It was sealed by the arrival of the Metropolitan and District Railways at Brompton, but for public relations reasons, it was re-named "South Kensington" in 1868. To facilitate public access to the museums, the railway company built a pedestrian tunnel directly from the station concourse to an exit halfway up Exhibition Road, next to the now defunct Royal Mail sorting office, to avoid crowds having to cross the Cromwell Road.

In 1906 the new Great Northern, Piccadilly and Brompton Railway company opened the Brompton Road tube station in the vicinity, thus adding a link directly to the political, commercial and financial heart of the capital in Westminster, the West End and the City of London, but owing to under use, it was shut in 1934. During the Second World War it was used by the 26th (London) Anti-Aircraft Brigade.

Since the First World War it has become a cosmopolitan area attracting Belgian and French refugees, but also Poles during the Second World War and after, as well as latterly Spanish, Italian, and American expatriates. Some residents also have a Middle Eastern origin. The French presence is emphasised by the Lycée Français Charles de Gaulle, the French Institute, housing a theatre now used as the Ciné Lumière with nearby the Alliance française, as well as the Consulate General of France, not far from the French Embassy in Knightsbridge. With a French bookshop and many international cafés in the area, it has been called "Paris's 21st arrondissement".

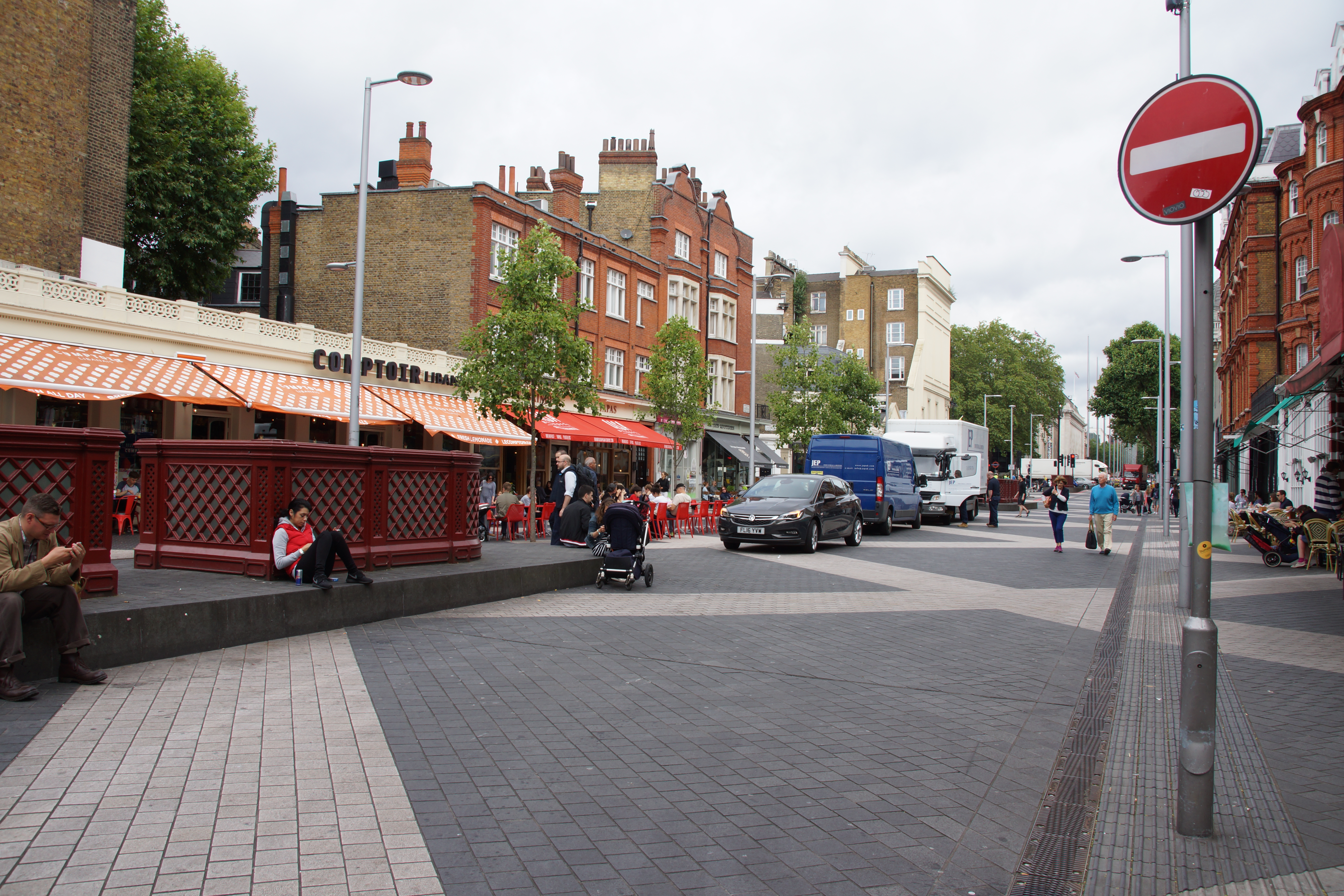
Exhibition Road, shared space

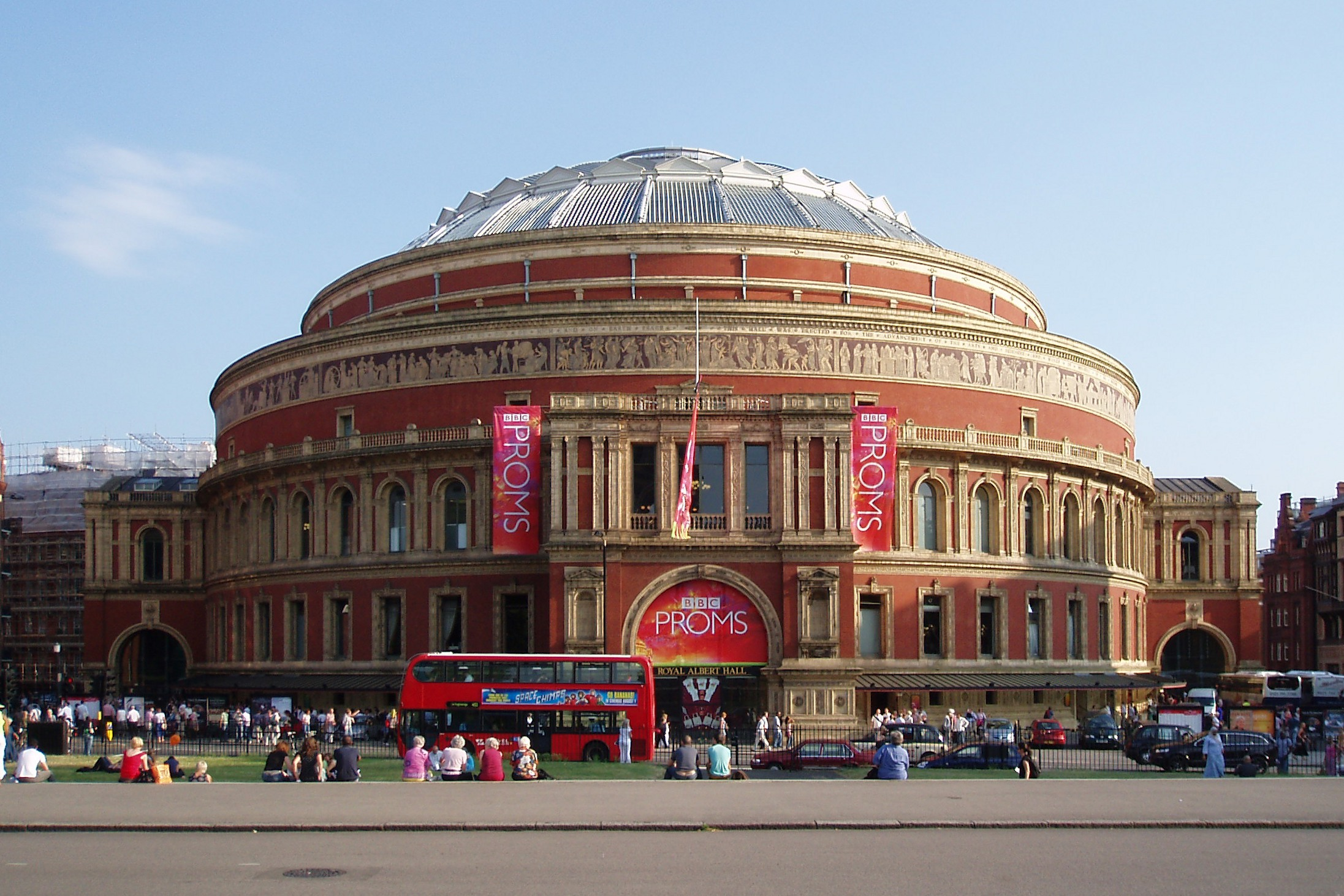
Royal Albert Hall, located on Kensington Gore

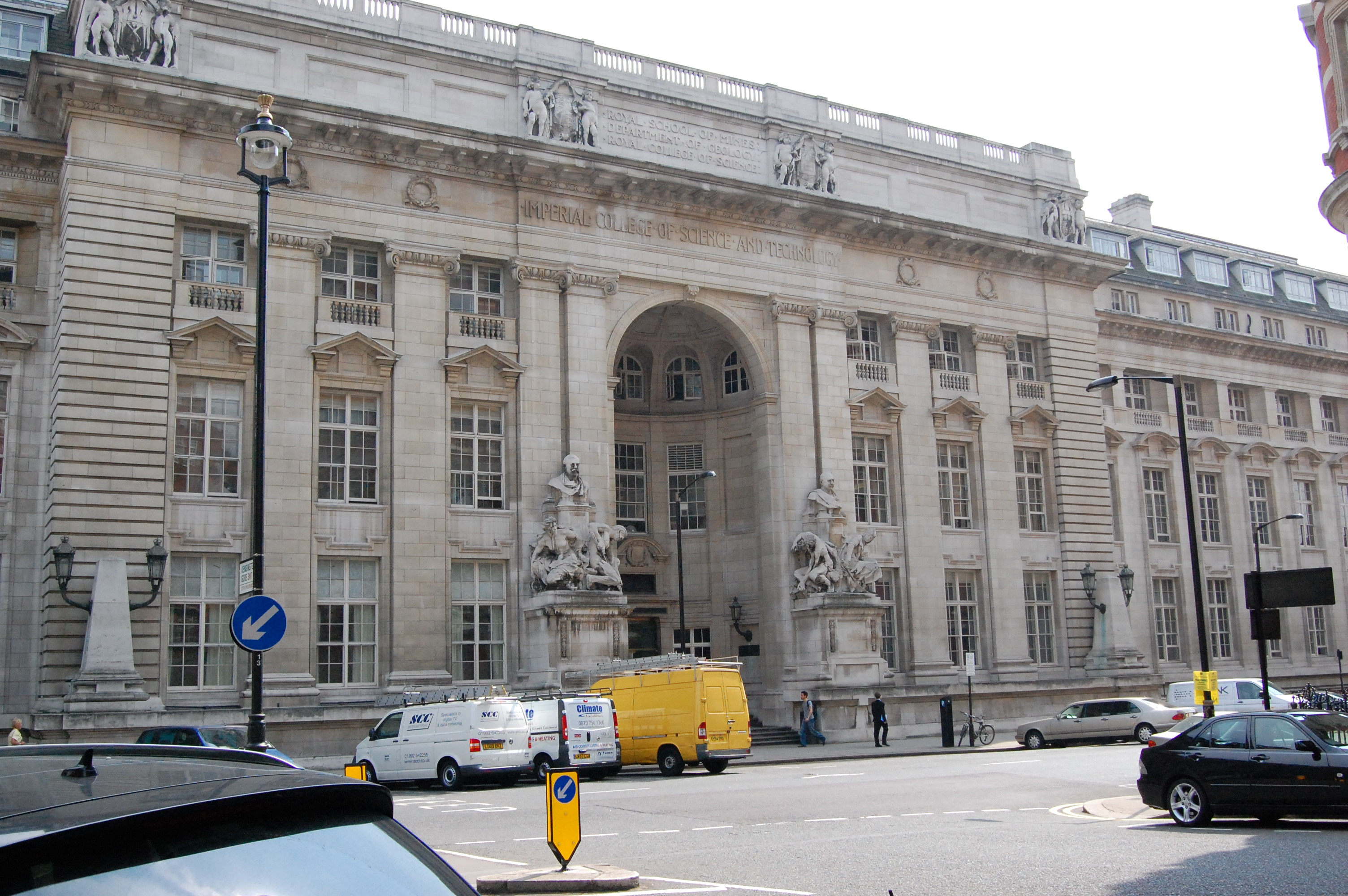
Imperial College, South Kensington, London

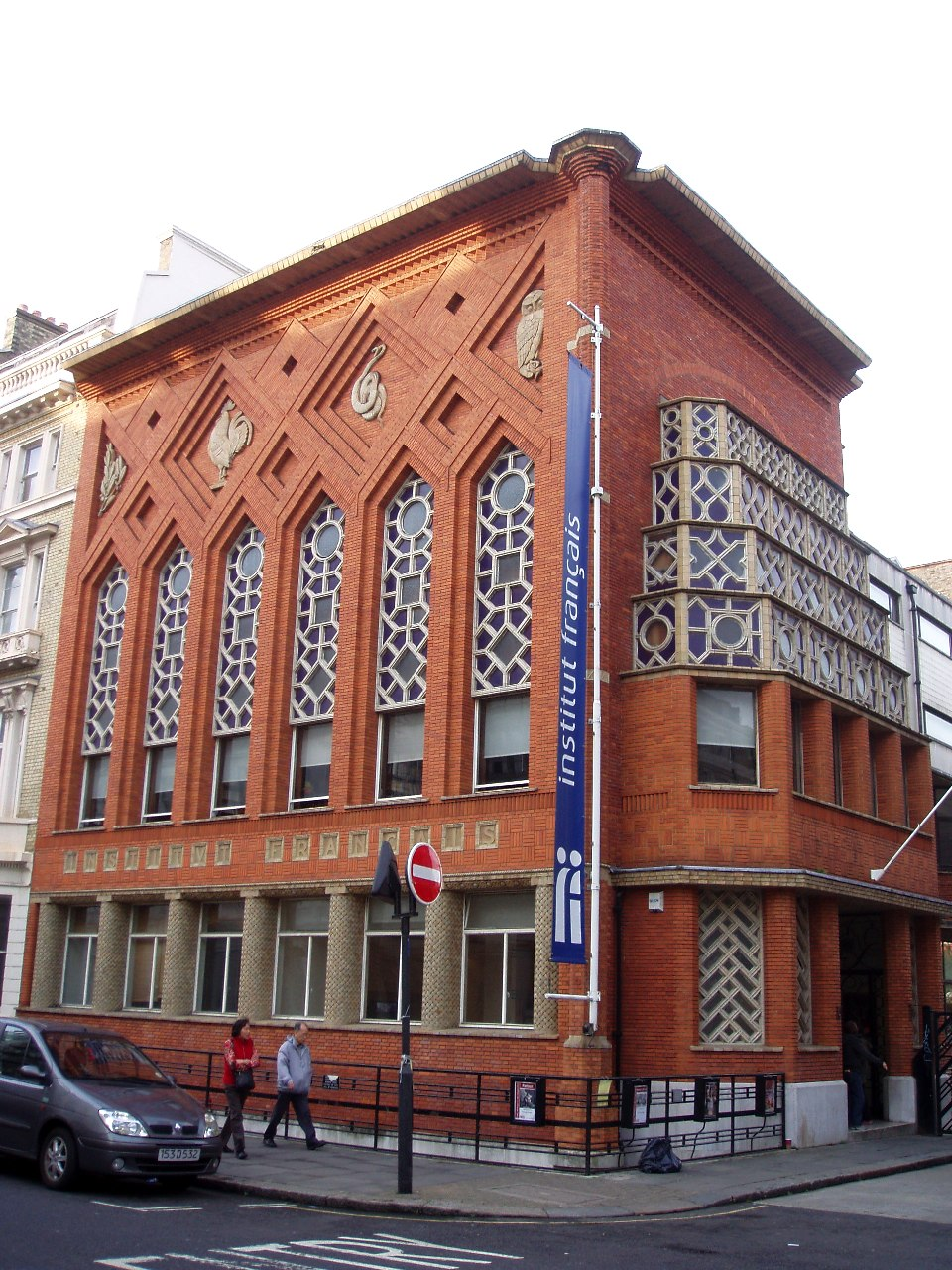
French Institute, housing Ciné Lumière, Queensberry, Place SW7

=== Iranian Embassy siege ===
In April and May 1980 a group of six Iranian Arabs entered the Iranian Embassy in South Kensington and took the staff, visitors and a diplomatic policeman hostage. There followed a six-day siege during which one of the hostages was killed. The British SAS finally stormed the building in a 17-minute operation, bringing out the hostages and the one surviving gunman, who was subsequently sentenced to 27 years in prison for his part in the offences.

== Geography ==
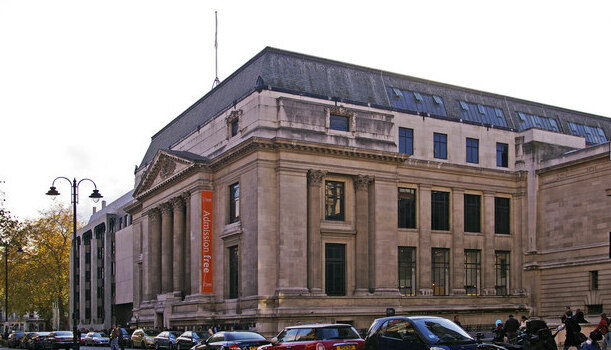
The Geological Museum (1843) at its new location, Exhibition Road from 1935, now integrated with the Science Museum

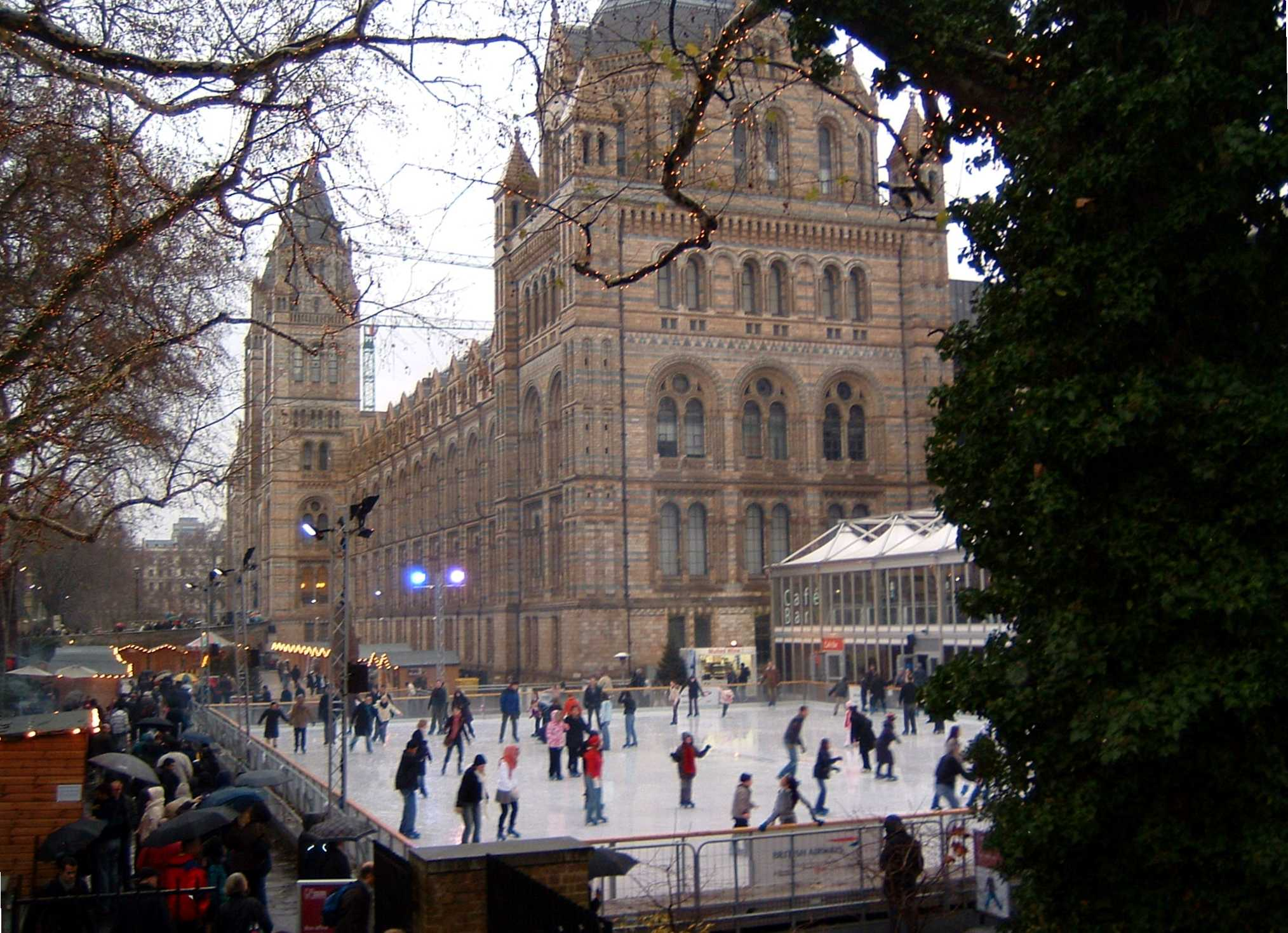
Natural History Museum ice rink

As is often the case in other areas of London, the boundaries for South Kensington are arbitrary and have altered with time. This is due in part to usage arising from the tube stops and other landmarks which developed across Brompton. A contemporary definition is the commercial area around the South Kensington tube station and the adjacent garden squares and streets (such as Onslow Square and Thurloe Square, opposite the Victoria and Albert Museum). To the north is the Kensington Gore, to the south the winding Fulham Road and streets leading to Sloane Square and to the west, the residential and hotel area of Gloucester Road. South Kensington station lies on the junction of several thoroughfares: principally the Old Brompton Road, Harrington Road and Pelham Street and a stone's throw from the arterial Cromwell Road. It is furthermore criss-crossed by the Exhibition Road and the stately Queen's Gate and Prince Consort Road. Until road lay-out improvements in 2012, the area was afflicted with traffic congestion and likened to a series of traffic islands.

Modern development of the area is the result of the creation of the temporary Albertopolis reached by Exhibition Road, whose terrain now includes the Natural History Museum, the Geological Museum, the Science Museum, the Victoria and Albert Museum, London Oratory and since 1915, the Lycée Français. Other local institutions include the Polish Institute and Sikorski Museum, Polish Hearth Club, London Goethe-Institut, the Royal Albert Hall, Imperial College London, the Royal Geographical Society, the Royal College of Art, the Royal College of Music and between 1903 and 1991, the Royal College of Organists, West London Air Terminal, the Ismaili Centre, London and the late comer 1960s Baden-Powell House some of which are administratively within the City of Westminster, but considered to be "within range of South Kensington". Although the SW7 postcode mainly covers South Kensington, it goes into Knightsbridge. The only Royal Mail Post Office in South Kensington closed in 2019.

Christie's auction house had a second London salesroom in the Old Brompton Road, South Kensington from 1975, which primarily handled the middle market. Christie's permanently closed the South Kensington salesroom in July 2017 as part of their restructuring plans announced March 2017. The closure was due in part to a considerable decrease in sales between 2015 and 2016 in addition to the company expanding its online presence.

Tim Waterstone opened his first eponymous Waterstones bookshop in 1982 in Old Brompton Road. It has given way to a Little Waitrose.

Caffè Nero also started life as a single coffee shop in Old Brompton Road, opened by Ian Semp in 1990. It was subsequently bought out and became a chain.

== Places of worship ==
The first church to rise among the fields at Brompton was the socially notable, but widely considered architecturally ugly, Holy Trinity Brompton in 1829. It served a wide area from the Kensington Canal in the west to the Kensington Turnpike in the north. The first incumbent, one Percival Frye, was the nephew of Archdeacon Alfred Pott, vicar of the neighbouring Kensington parish. It was followed by:

- St Mary The Boltons (1849–1850)
- All Saints' Church, Ennismore Gardens (1849) by Lewis Vulliamy; in 1978 this became the Russian Orthodox Dormition Cathedral
- The Brompton Oratory (1853), an architecturally imposing Roman Catholic church
- St Paul's, Onslow Square (consecrated in 1860)
- St Peter's, Cranley Gardens (1866–1867), since 1973 the Armenian cathedral in London
- St Stephen's, Gloucester Road (1866–1867)
- St Augustine's, Queen's Gate (1877), a "High church project"
- Holy Trinity Prince Consort Road (1899)
- Deutsche Evangelische Christuskirche (1904–1905)
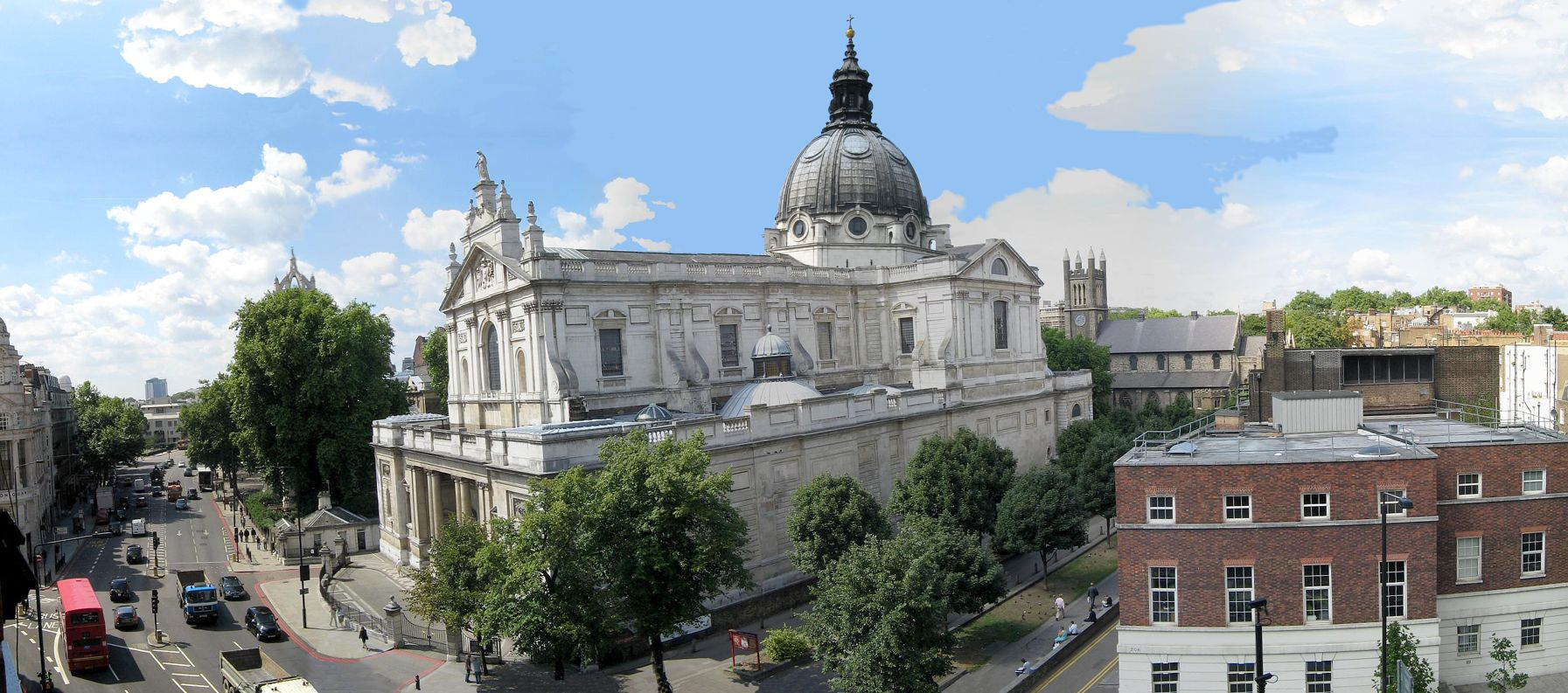
The Brompton Oratory

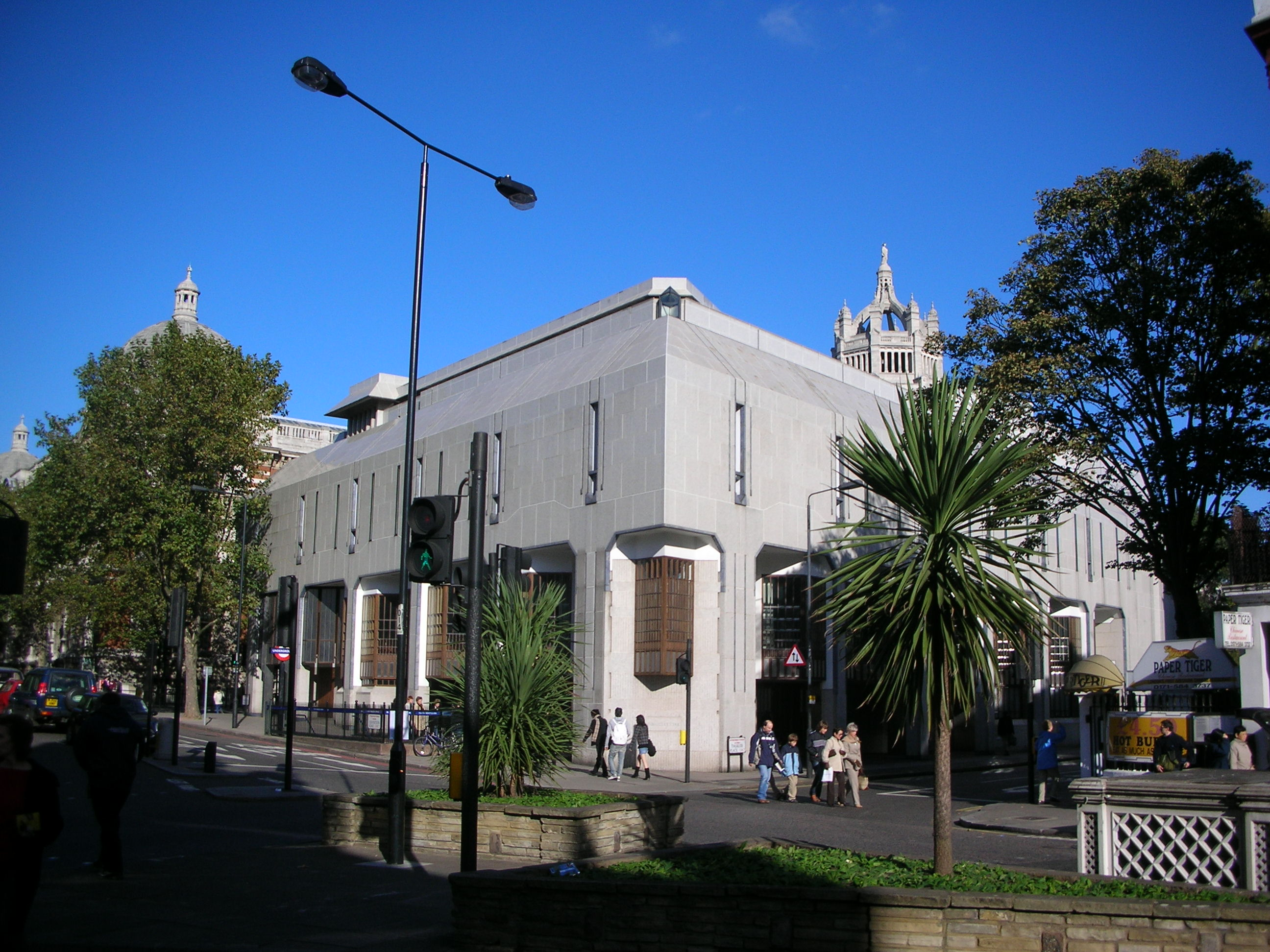
The Ismaili Centre, South Kensington

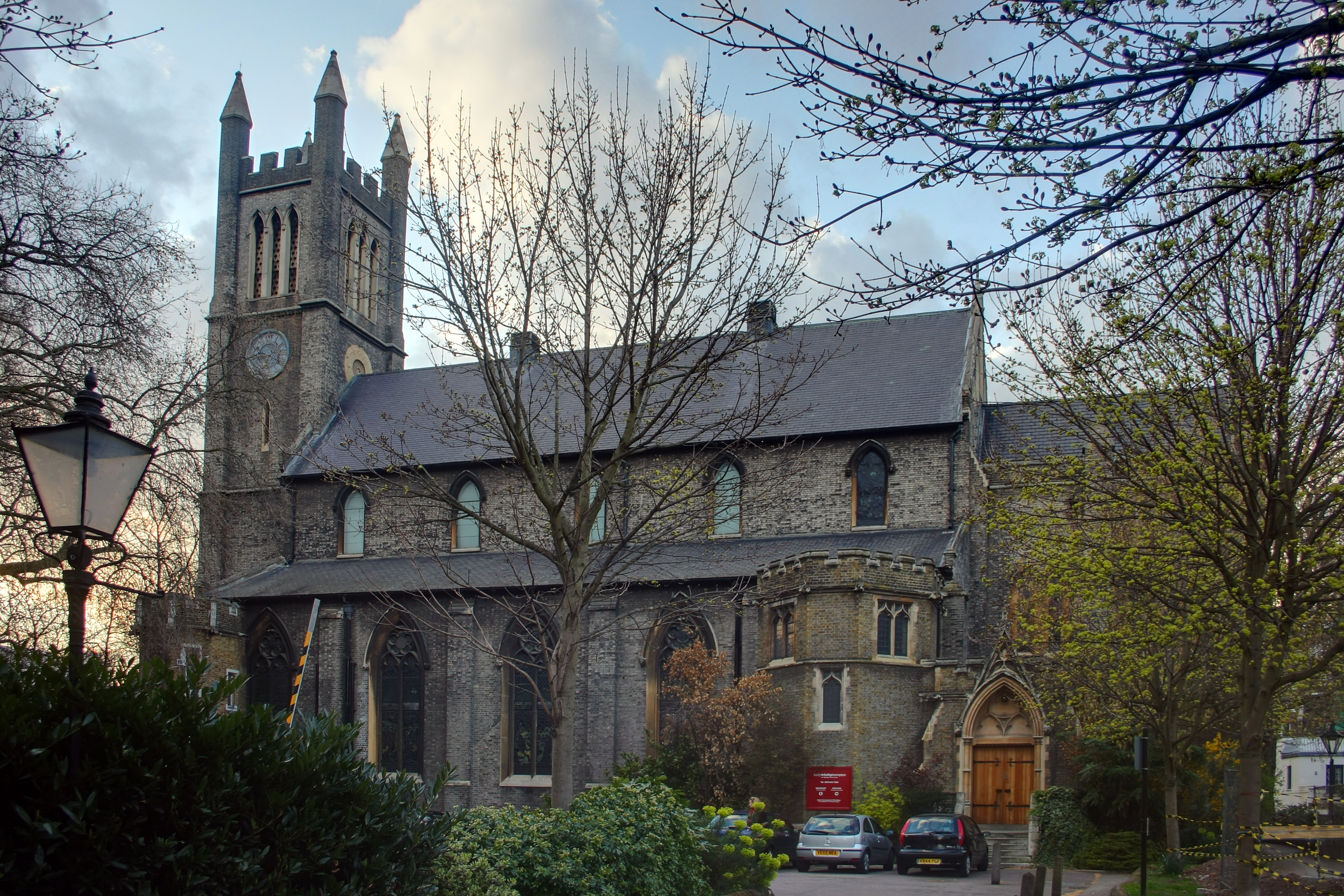
Holy Trinity Brompton

== Notable residents ==
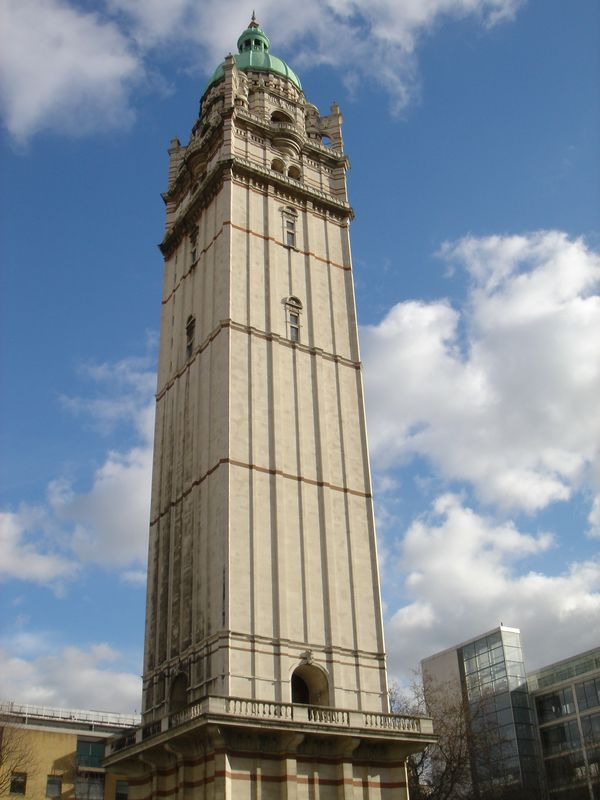
The Queen's Tower, Imperial College

Residents have included:

- Francis Bacon (1909–1992), Irish-born British artist, lived at 17 Queensberry Mews and 7 Reese Mews.
- Charles Booth (1840–1916), pioneer of social research, lived at 6 Grenville Place.
- Henry Cole (1808–1882), campaigner, educator and first director of the South Kensington Museum (later the Victoria and Albert Museum), inventor of the Christmas card, lived at 33 Thurloe Square.
- Angela Delevingne (1912–2004), socialite, was born in South Kensington
- Robert FitzRoy (1805–1865), commander of HMS Beagle, on board which the naturalist Charles Darwin also sailed, lived at 38 Onslow Square.
- Alan A. Freeman (1920–1985), record producer, lived at 57 Cromwell Road from the 1940s to the 1960s.
- Nicholas Freeman, OBE (1939–1989), controversial Leader of the Royal Borough of Kensington and Chelsea, lived in Harrington Gardens.
- Dennis Gabor (1900–1979), electrical engineer and physicist, most notable for inventing holography, 1971 Nobel Prize in Physics. Lived in No. 79, Queen's Gate.
- Hyam Greenbaum (conductor) and Sidonie Goossens (harpist) lived at 5, Wetherby Gardens from the beginning of 1929.
- Benny Hill (1924–1992), comedian, lived at 1 & 2 Queen's Gate.
- John Lavery (1856-1951), Irish painter, lived at 5 Cromwell Place.
- Erna Low (1909–2002), Vienna-born businesswoman who pioneered the package holiday, lived in Reece Mews.
- Clementina Maude, Viscountess Hawarden, Victorian photographer, lived from 1859 until her death in 1865 at 5 Princes Gardens.
- William Makepeace Thackeray (1811–1863), novelist, lived at 36 Onslow Square from 1853 to 1860.
- Herbert Beerbohm Tree (1853–1917), actor-manager, lived at 31 Rosary Gardens.
- George Wallis, FSA (1811–1891), artist, museum curator and art educator, first Keeper of Fine Art Collection at South Kensington Museum.
  - His children, including Whitworth Wallis and Rosa Wallis

== Nearby places ==
- Brompton
- Chelsea
- Earls Court
- Kensington
- Knightsbridge
