= St Paul's Theological Centre =

Coordinates: 51.4979°N 0.1699°W

St Paul's Theological Centre (SPTC) is a British centre for theological learning, based at Holy Trinity Brompton (HTB) in South Kensington, London. It is led by its principal, the Reverend Russell Winfield.

SPTC runs a four-week Monday evening course, called School of Theology, for members of HTB and other churches. It also runs a monthly podcast called GodPod which has had over 1,000,000 downloads.

SPTC is a constituent member of St Mellitus College.
