= Alpha course =

Program of Christian evangelism

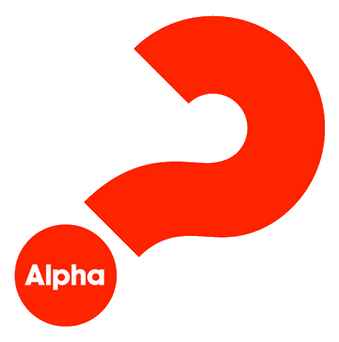
Alpha logo

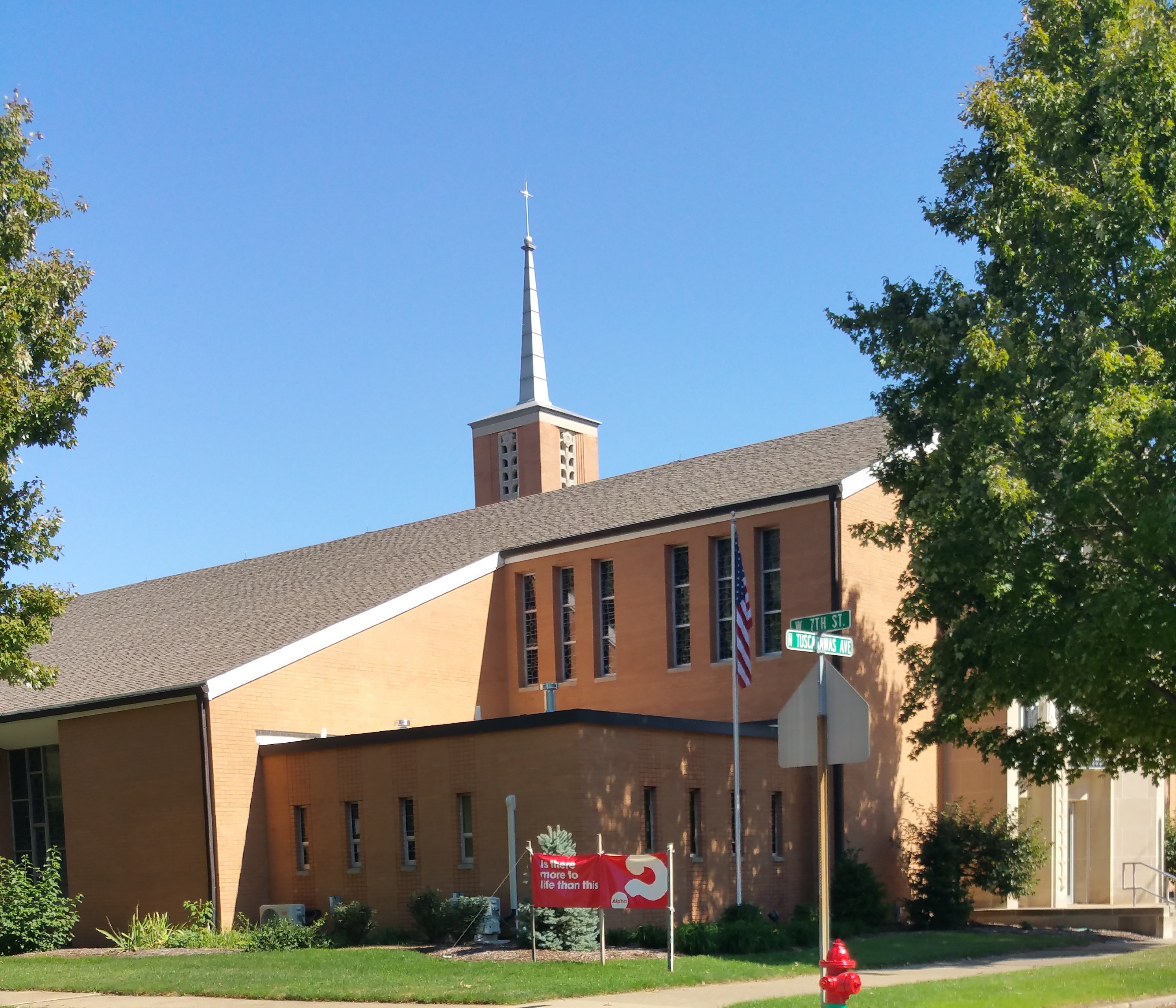
Alpha course sign displayed at Saint Joseph Catholic Church in Dover, Ohio

The Alpha course is an evangelistic course that seeks to introduce the basics of the Christian faith through a series of talks and discussions. It is described by its organisers as "an opportunity to explore the meaning of life". Alpha courses are run in churches, homes, workplaces, prisons, universities and a wide variety of other locations. The course began in Britain and is run around the world by various Christian denominations.

== History ==
Alpha originated in 1977 with the work of Charles Marnham, a curate at Holy Trinity Brompton (HTB), a parish of the Church of England in London. It started as a course for church members regarding the basics of beliefs commonly held by many believers in Christ, but then began to be used as an introduction for those interested in the faith. John Irvine, Marnham's successor curate at HTB, took over the running of the course in 1981 and developed the 10-week format that continues to this day. In 1985 Nicky Lee took on the course, and in 1990 Nicky Gumbel, then also curate at Holy Trinity, took over the running of the course at the invitation of Sandy Millar (vicar at that time) and oversaw its revision and expansion.

Alpha grew rapidly in Britain in the 1990s, from just four courses in 1991 to 2,500 in 1995. It reached a peak in 1998, when 10,500 courses were run. By 2001 this figure had fallen to 7,300. In 2018 the Alpha website described the course as running in over 100 countries and in over 100 languages, with more than 24 million people having taken the course. As of 2022 the Alpha website states that the course "has been translated into 112 different languages".

Courses have been run by Anglican, Presbyterian, Lutheran, Baptist, Methodist, Pentecostal, Eastern Orthodox and Roman Catholic churches, with some variations in course material.

== Structure ==
Alpha is organised as a series of sessions over 10 weeks, including a day or weekend away. Each session starts with a meal, followed by a talk and then discussion in small groups. The talks aim to cover the basic beliefs of the Christian faith.

In April 2016, Alpha introduced the Alpha Film Series, where traditional Alpha content is shown in a series of films, featuring stories and interviews. This series is mainly presented by Nicky Gumbel, Toby Flint (a curate at Holy Trinity Brompton) and Gemma Hunt. Interviewees include Bear Grylls, Jackie Pullinger, and Raniero Cantalamessa.

=== Religious education for schools ===
In conjunction with Youth for Christ, Alpha International produces two study programmes designed for children aged 11–14, exploRE: The Christian Faith, a 12-week programme on the Christian faith, and exploRE: The Life of Jesus, a 14-lesson study of Jesus' birth, life, death and resurrection. The capitalised RE is a reference to religious education, part of the British curriculum. The materials are aimed at religious education teachers.

=== Relationship programmes ===
Several relationship-oriented programmes have emerged alongside Alpha that are now separately run by a sister organisation called Relationship Central. The Marriage Course is a seven-session course for married couples, consisting of a "candlelit meal and/or coffee, tea and dessert at a romantic table for two while listening to practical talks that are informative and fun, either given live or played on DVD", while the Marriage Preparation Course follows a similar format over five sessions in preparation for married life. Unlike Alpha, there are no group sessions - the couple are to spend the time together, and relationship details are not shared with a counsellor or other participants. The Marriage Course was adopted by the British Army and an additional session on enforced separation (e.g. as a result of operational deployment) was added by a military couple working in co-operation with Relationship Central. In 2012, DVD versions of the Parenting Children Course (for parents or caregivers of children aged 0–10) and the Parenting Teenagers Course (11-18) were released. Unlike the Marriage Course, the parenting courses use a similar format to Alpha: a meal followed by a talk and group discussions.

The website says about these courses that while they are "based on Christian principles", they are "designed for all couples with or without a church background". The courses are authored by Nicky Lee and Sila Lee, staff at Holy Trinity Brompton and authors of The Marriage Book and The Parenting Book.

=== Caring for ex-offenders ===
Caring for ex-offenders is a follow-up to the Alpha for Prisons course, supporting released prisoners by providing them with material assistance including accommodation, work, food, and pastoral support through church life. It operates in Britain, Canada, South Africa and the United States.

=== St Paul's Theological Centre ===
St Paul's Theological Centre is Alpha/Holy Trinity Brompton's theological institution, with aims to provide lay and clerical training in theology and resources for theological training in churches across the world, as well as theological guidance for Alpha.

== Doctrine ==
Alpha's teachings are intended to centre upon aspects of Christian faith on which all denominations are in general agreement. Nicky Gumbel says (quoting the current Apostolic Preacher Raniero Cantalamessa), "What unites us is infinitely greater than what divides us."

Distinctive Roman Catholic and Eastern Orthodox tenets, such as those concerning the Virgin Mary and certain sacramental teachings, are absent, as are Baptist teachings on baptism.

The New International Version of the Bible is quoted in the course materials.

Three of the fifteen sessions are given to the person and work of the Holy Spirit and cover the infilling of the Spirit; speaking in tongues and healing via prayer. Conversion stories in the book of Acts (see 2:1ff, 9:17-19, 10:44-46, 19:1-6) are seen as normative.

== Influences ==
Alpha's greatest influence came from the ministry of John Wimber, who visited Holy Trinity Brompton a number of times during the 1980s and 1990s. Nicky Gumbel's approach is linked to the Iwerne camps ministry of E. J. H. Nash, an influential Anglican cleric who set out to evangelise "top boys at top schools" and who organised summer camps at Iwerne Minster in Dorset. David Fletcher, who took responsibility for the camps after Nash, described Alpha as: "basically the Iwerne camp talk scheme with charismatic stuff added on." Rob Warner addresses both, when he says: "Alpha can ... be summed up as [Nash] camp rationalistic conservatism combined with Wimberist charismatic expressivism ... this is a highly unusual, even paradoxical hybrid."

== Usage ==
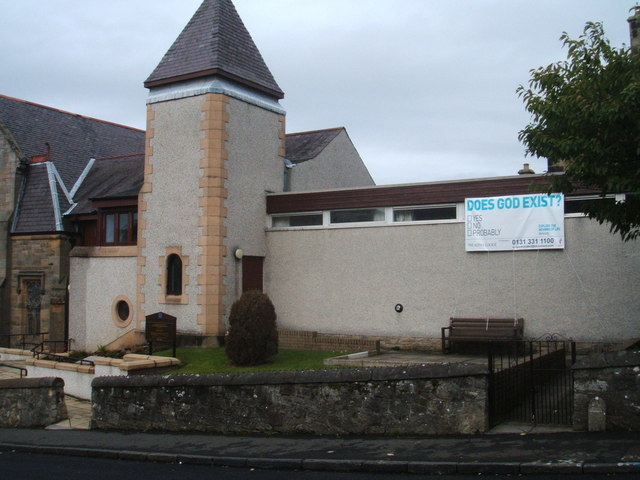
The Alpha course being advertised at a church in South Queensferry, Edinburgh

Although originating from the evangelical Anglican tradition, Alpha is now used in various denominations around the world. Its supporters include many Catholic cardinals, Anglican archbishops and bishops, and leading figures of all denominations. Former Archbishop of Canterbury, George Carey described the courses as "superb." Rowan Williams was an enthusiastic supporter when he was Bishop of Monmouth and Archbishop of Wales, and he continued his support as Archbishop of Canterbury, opening an Alpha conference and accepting an invitation to speak at an Alpha supper in London in 2004. He has described it as "a very special tool" and "a unique mixture of Christian content and Christian style". Father Raniero Cantalamessa, a monk of the Order of Friars Minor Capuchin and Preacher to the Papal Household for Pope Benedict XVI wrote a document praising Alpha in June 2005.

== Criticism ==
Alpha been criticised for having a charismatic emphasis, with some non-charismatic evangelicals criticising Gumbel's emphasis upon the person and work of the Holy Spirit in particular.

More conservative critics (especially from a Reformed and evangelical perspective) have complained that the course does not adequately define sin, and therefore does not properly explain the reason for Jesus's death and resurrection. The alternative Christianity Explored course is an attempt to go beyond what Alpha teaches on sin.

John Vincent of the Urban Theology Unit in Sheffield has suggested that Alpha presents too narrow a version of Christianity and one too centred on what theologians have said about Jesus, rather than allowing students the freedom to draw their own inspiration from studying Jesus' life and teaching. "The Alpha course, because of its didactic style, its narrow-mindedness and its closed nature, doesn't facilitate alternative views," he says. "I happen to believe it therefore leads people into a self-centred religion which is not the same as the genuine Christian discipleship."

Some Catholics have criticised the fifteen-session Alpha in a Catholic Context version of the course for being unbalanced without sufficiently presenting some Roman Catholic doctrines, which instead need to be added afterwards in additional sessions.

== See also ==
- Awareness Course
- Cursillo – Catholic organization
- Living the Questions – DVD and web-based curriculum
