= Robert Battiscombe =

English cricketer

Robert Samuel Battiscombe (13 April 1799 – 13 March 1881) was an English cricketer associated with Cambridge University who was active in the 1820s. He is recorded in two matches from 1819 to 1821, totalling 29 runs with a highest score of 17.

Battiscombe was born at Clewer in Berkshire and educated at Eton College and King's College, Cambridge. He was admitted to the Bar as a lawyer in 1827, but later became a Church of England clergyman, serving as vicar of Holy Trinity Brompton, London, from 1835 to 1840 and Barkway with Reed, Hertfordshire, from 1840 to his death in 1881 aged 81.

== Bibliography ==
- Haygarth, Arthur (1996) [1862]. Scores & Biographies, Volume 1 (1744–1826). Kennington: Frederick Lillywhite. ISBN 978-19-00592-23-9.
- Haygarth, Arthur (1997) [1862]. Scores & Biographies, Volume 2 (1827–1840). Kennington: Frederick Lillywhite. ISBN 978-19-00592-23-9.
