= Stuart Townend (headmaster) =

British athlete and politician (1909–2002)

Lieutenant-Colonel H. Stuart Townend OBE

Personal details
- Born: 24 April 1909
- Died: 26 October 2002 (aged 93)
- Party: Liberal (later) Conservative
- Children: Richard Townend
- Education: St Edmund's School Canterbury; Brasenose College, Oxford; University of St. Gallen

Military service
- Allegiance: United Kingdom
- Branch/service: British Army
- Years of service: 1933–1947
- Rank: Lieutenant-Colonel
- Unit: Royal Artillery

Stuart Townend
Medal record

Men's Athletics

Representing England

British Empire Games
Gold medal – first place	1930 Hamilton	4×440 yd relay

Lieutenant-Colonel Henry Stewart Townend OBE MA (24 April 1909 – 26 October 2002), known as Stuart Townend, was a British military officer, athlete, headmaster, and politician. Townend was the headmaster of the first school to teach an heir to the British throne, Hill House School, which he founded.

By 1940, he had changed the spelling of the middle name he used from Stewart to Stuart.

== Early life ==
Born at Shrawardine, Shropshire, the son of a Church of England clergyman, the Rev. F. W. Townend, later of Tilney St Lawrence, and his wife Florence Stewart, Townend was educated at St Edmund's School, Canterbury, Brasenose College, Oxford, and the University of St. Gallen, in Switzerland.

== Sporting career ==
Townend went up to Oxford in 1928, where he became president of the Oxford University Athletic Club and winner of six Oxford blues. In 1930 he won a gold medal at the British Empire Games in Hamilton, Ontario, in the 4×440 yard relay. Townend finished second behind Tommy Hampson in the 880 yards event at the 1931 AAA Championships.

== Military career ==
After Oxford, on 23 August 1931 Townend was commissioned onto the Territorial Army’s General List as a second lieutenant. In April 1933 he was commissioned into the Royal Artillery and went on to serve in India. In March 1938, he resigned his position as an Experimental Officer at the Royal Artillery School of Gunnery, Shoeburyness, and resigned his commission. In January 1940, he was reinstated as a Lieutenant in the Royal Artillery. During the Second World War, he held the appointment of Assistant Quartermaster general, then was Assistant Adjutant-General, World Wide Air Movements, at the War Office. After D-Day he was given command of a battery in the Allied advance across North-West Europe, when his battery clerk was Corporal Harry Secombe. He was badly wounded when hit by a mortar shell, but later returned to active service and took part in the liberation of Buchenwald. In April 1946, while a temporary Lieutenant Colonel, he was mentioned in dispatches for “gallant and distinguished services in North West Europe.

== Later career ==
In 1947, Townend retired from the army and became housing chairman of the London Olympics of 1948, organising the accommodation at short notice for the athletes and officials attending the event to be held the following year. There was no time or money to build athletes’ villages, and 3500 of the athletes and sportsmen were put into three camps in Richmond Park, Uxbridge, and High Wycombe. The remainder and all the officials were put up in 41 schools and colleges across London. As a reward for his efforts, he was given an OBE in the 1949 New Year Honours. He was director-general of the Hotels and Restaurants Association, a director of an international publishing company, briefly head of an international school in Switzerland, and a director and founder of the Anglo-Swiss Society of Great Britain. He founded Hill House International Junior School, in Knightsbridge, London, in 1951, with his wife. In 1956 Prince Charles joined the school as a pupil. It was the first time an heir to the British throne had been sent to school, as opposed to being educated by private tutors. Townend championed a "stripped down to basics" approach to independent education that enabled him to keep his fees among the lowest in the country. He continued to run the school until his death in 2002 aged 93. At that time it was reportedly the world's largest private junior school with over 1,100 pupils.

== Political career ==
For ten years Townend was a member of Paddington Borough Council. He was the Liberal candidate for the Torquay division of Devon at the 1950 General Election and subsequently for the Falmouth and Camborne division of Cornwall at the 1951 General Election.

General Election 1950: Torquay
Party	Candidate	Votes	%	±%
Conservative	Charles Williams	29,153	53.6	+4.7
Labour	Robert Briscoe	14,287	26.2	+0.1
Liberal	Henry Stuart Townend	10,987	20.2	−4.8
Majority		14,866	27.3	+4.6
Turnout			82.8	+11.4
Conservative hold		Swing	+2.3	

General Election 1951: Falmouth & Camborne
Party	Candidate	Votes	%	±%
Labour	Frank Harold Hayman	20,850	46.3	+3.1
Conservative	Nigel Nicolson	19,847	44.1	+5.4
Liberal	Henry Stuart Townend	4,343	9.6	−8.5
Majority		1,003	2.2	−2.3
Turnout			83.6	+1.0
Labour hold		Swing	-1.1	

He did not stand for parliament again. He later left the Liberal Party and joined the Conservatives. In 1958, as a Conservative, he was elected to the London County Council as a member for Chelsea and was a member of its Education Committee. After serving two terms, he stood down in 1965.

== Personal life ==
In 1936, Townend married Beatrice Lord, and they had a son, Richard Townend, who became an organist and took charge of the music at his father's school, eventually succeeding him as headmaster.
