= John T. C. B. Collins =

British priest (1925–2022)

John Theodore Cameron Bucke Collins (25 August 1925 – 8 December 2022) was a British Anglican priest who was instrumental in the charismatic revival movement in the Church of England.

== Biography ==
Previously from a high church background, Collins was converted to Evangelical Christianity at an Iwerne camp. He studied at Haileybury and Clare College, Cambridge, before training for ordination at Ridley Hall, Cambridge, and undertaking his first curacy at All Soul's Langham Place under the incumbency of John Stott.

Collins began his transition to a charismatic bent at an all-night prayer vigil in the winter of 1963, in what became known as the "Night of Prayer." According to Collins, "the 'visitation of the Holy Spirit' lasted three weeks and transformed his rundown church of St Mark’s, Gillingham and young curates into catalysts for what would become known as the "Charismatic Renewal" in Britain." Despite the skepticism of his ecclesiastical superiors, Collins went on to become a key figure in the charismatic movement, which according to the historian Diarmaid MacCulloch was "one of the great surprises of 20th-century Christianity...A holiness movement [that] sprang out of the teaching of the early Methodists, proclaiming that the Holy Spirit could bring an intense experience of holiness or sanctification into the everyday life of any believing Christian."

In 1980 Collins was appointed vicar of Holy Trinity Brompton, previously a sparsely-attended high church parish that he transformed into a bastion of the Charismatic Movement with an evening congregation of roughly 1,000. The parish would also function as the base for a church planting effort, taking over struggling parishes and moving them to an evangelical style of worship.

=== Personal life and death ===
Collins married Diana Kimpton (died 2013), an actress, in 1955, having met at a London rally held by the U.S. evangelist Billy Graham. The couple had two children, Dominic and Richenda. He died in Adlestrop, Gloucestershire on 8 December 2022, aged 97.

Church of England titles
Preceded by Raymond Hilton Turvey	Vicar of Holy Trinity Brompton; 1980–1985	Succeeded by Sandy Millar
