= Onslow Square =

Garden square in South Kensington, London, England

Coordinates: 51°29′33″N 0°10′25″W

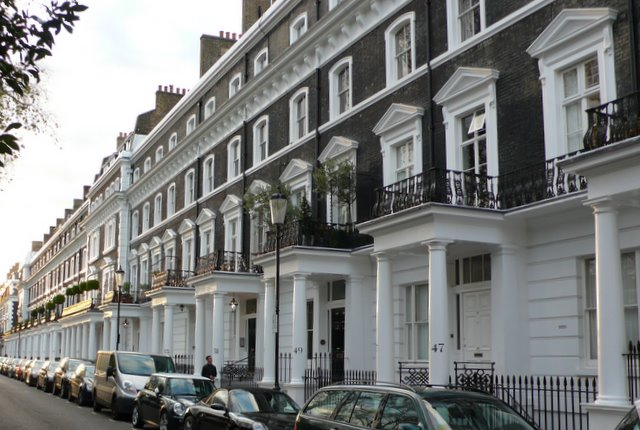
The northwest side of the square

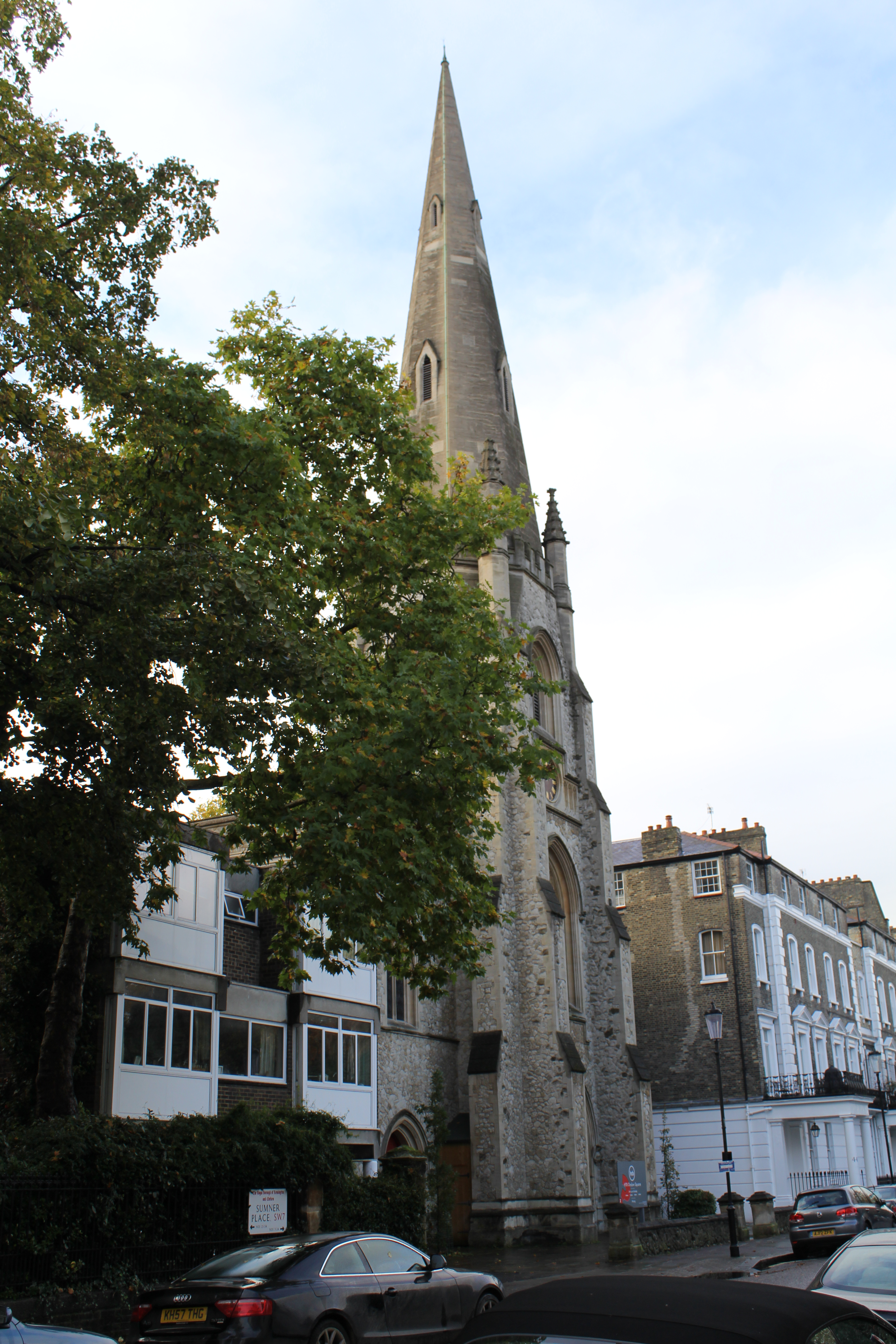
St Paul's Church

Onslow Square is a garden square in South Kensington, London, England.

It is set back between the Old Brompton Road to the northwest and the Fulham Road to the southeast. To the north is South Kensington Underground station. To the south is the Royal Marsden Hospital. As well as the main square, the address covers the street to the southwest that turns into Onslow Gardens, and the street to the northwest that meets Pelham Street by South Kensington tube station.

== History ==
The houses were built by Charles James Freake, on land belonging to Smith's Charity. His building agreement with the trustees of the charity stipulated that they should be stuccoed, and constructed to elevational designs and specifications provided by the trustees' architect and surveyor, George Basevi. The first four houses in the square, numbers 1,3,5, and 7, were begun in September 1845, and were occupied by 1847. The whole square was completed by 1865.

After the building of the first four houses, and Basevi’s sudden death in 1845, the style of the houses diverged from agreed design, using exposed grey stock brick, nonetheless of similar elevations and with substantial stucco dressings.

== St Paul's Church ==
St Paul's Church in Onslow Square was created as a part of Sir Charles James Freake's development of the square. The church was built during 1859–60, designed by James Edmeston together with Charles Freake's office. In 1876, a church hall was constructed south of the church. This was extended in 1893. The church is now administered by Holy Trinity Brompton Church.

== Notable people ==
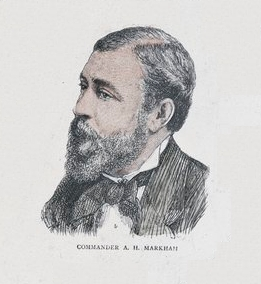
Sir Albert Hastings Markham, who lived at 4 Onslow Square as a child

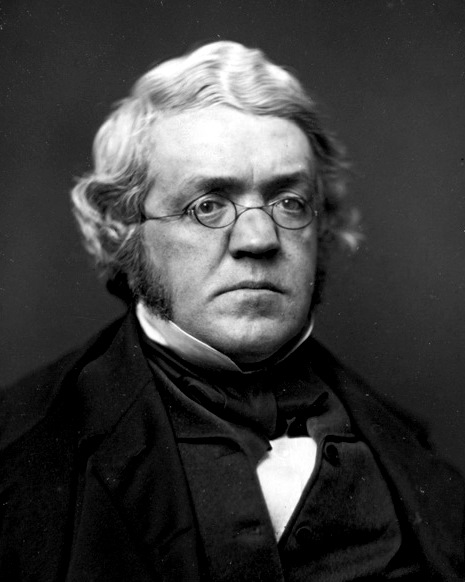
The novelist William Makepeace Thackeray, who lived at 36 Onslow Square from 1853 to 1860

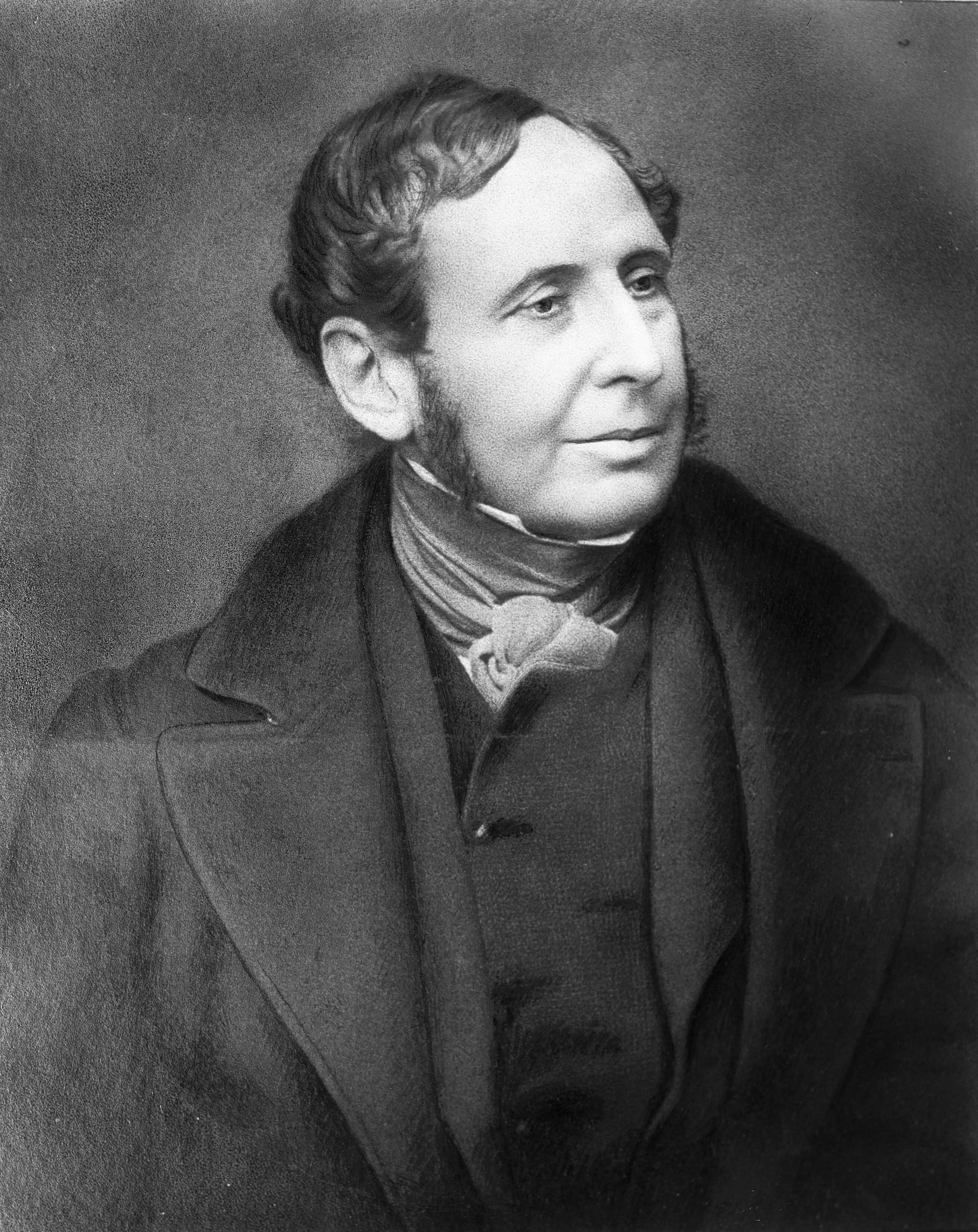
Vice-Admiral Robert FitzRoy, who resided at 38 Onslow Square from 1854 until his death in 1865

Sir Albert Hastings Markham, KCB (1841–1918), explorer, author, and officer in the Royal Navy, lived at 4 Onslow Square as a child.

The architect Edwin Lutyens and his sister Mary Wemyss lived at number 16 as children.

The novelist William Makepeace Thackeray lived at 36 Onslow Square from 1853 to 1860. Here he wrote the last part of The Newcomes, the Lectures on the Four Georges, The Virginians, and some of The Adventures of Philip and The Roundabout Papers.

Vice-Admiral Robert FitzRoy (1805–1865), commander of HMS Beagle, on board which the naturalist Charles Darwin (1809–1882) also sailed, lived at 38 Onslow Square. Fitzroy lived at No 38 from 1854 to 1865, when he committed suicide (but in another residence in Norwood), through guilt for his part in casting doubt about the truth of the Bible.

Herbert Edward Ryle DD KCVO (1856–1925), later an Old Testament scholar and the Dean of Westminster, was born in the square on 25 May 1856.

Edmund Fisher (1872–1918), British architect, was born in Onslow Square.

John Parker (1799–1881), a barrister and Whig politician, died at 57 Onslow Square.

The architect William Railton, designer of Nelson’s Column, lived at 65 Onslow Square. His daughter married the Rev. Barclay Fowell Buxton (1860–1946), who was curate at Onslow Square from 1884 to 1887. The sculptor Baron Carlo Marochetti – who cast the lions for the column – lived at number 34, and had a workshop and foundry nearby in Sydney Mews.

Frederic John Sidney Parry (1810–1885), an entomologist, lived in Onslow Square.

John William Crombie (1858–1908), a Scottish woollen manufacturer, folklorist and Liberal Party politician, died in the square.

Robert Buhler RA (1916–1989), a Swiss landscape and portrait artist, lived at No. 38.

British billionaire Richard Caring lives in a "£40m mansion" with a two-storey basement, Park House, which replaced a 19th-century cottage that had been owned by Gert-Rudolf Flick, heir to German industrial wealth.

== See also ==
- Earl of Onslow
