= Nicky Lee (priest) =

English Anglican priest and author

The Reverend Prebendary Nicky Lee
- Born: Nicholas Knyvett Lee; 1954 (age 71–72)
- Education: Trinity College, Cambridge; Cranmer Hall, Durham
- Occupations: Priest; Author
- Spouse: Sila Lee (m. 1976)
- Religion: Christianity (Anglican)
- Church: Church of England
- Ordained: 1985 (deacon); 1986 (priest)
- Offices held: Curate, Holy Trinity Brompton (1985–2007); Associate Vicar, Holy Trinity Brompton (since 2007); Prebendary, St Paul's Cathedral (since 2016)

Nicholas Knyvett Lee (born 1954) is an English Anglican priest and author. He served as associate vicar of Holy Trinity Brompton in the Diocese of London. With his wife, Sila, he founded the organisation Relationship Central, an umbrella organisation for The Marriage Course, The Marriage Preparation Course, The Parenting Children Course and The Parenting Teenagers Course. As of 2016, 7,000 separate courses were running in 127 countries, in 46 different languages.

== Early life and career ==
Lee was born in 1954. He studied English at Trinity College, Cambridge. He proceeded to study theology and prepare for ordination in the Church of England at Cranmer Hall, Durham. He was ordained deacon in 1985 and priest in 1986, becoming curate, then associate vicar, of Holy Trinity Brompton, now one of the largest Anglican churches in the UK.

Lee met his wife, Sila, at the age of 18 at Swansea docks while waiting for a ferry to Ireland. They married in 1976 and have four children.

== Relationship Central ==
The organisation Relationship Central started with The Marriage Course in 2005 – a series of seven sessions designed to help couples invest in their relationship and build a strong marriage. Lee, with his wife Sila, developed The Marriage Course for couples looking for practical support to strengthen their relationship. The course is designed to help couples build strong foundations, learn to communicate more effectively and resolve differences well. As of 2012, it has been translated into 40 languages and was running in 109 countries. As of 2016, more than 7,000 separate courses were running in 127 countries, in 46 different languages. The Marriage Course has been adopted by the British Army and an additional session on enforced separation (for example, as a result of operational deployment) was added by a military couple working in co-operation with Relationship Central. The Marriage Course is used by and recommended by a number of churches, organisations and companies, and is recognised by the SALT Christian dating app as 'an amazing resource full of Godly wisdom and practical advice'.

The suite of courses has expanded to include: The Marriage Preparation Course, The Parenting Children Course, and The Parenting Teenagers Course.

== Honours and awards ==
In February 2016, it was announced that Lee had been appointed a prebendary of St Paul's Cathedral, London. He was installed in March 2016 in a service at the cathedral.

== See also ==
- Alpha course
- Nicky Gumbel
- Martyn Layzell
- St Paul's, Onslow Square
