= St Paul's, Onslow Square =

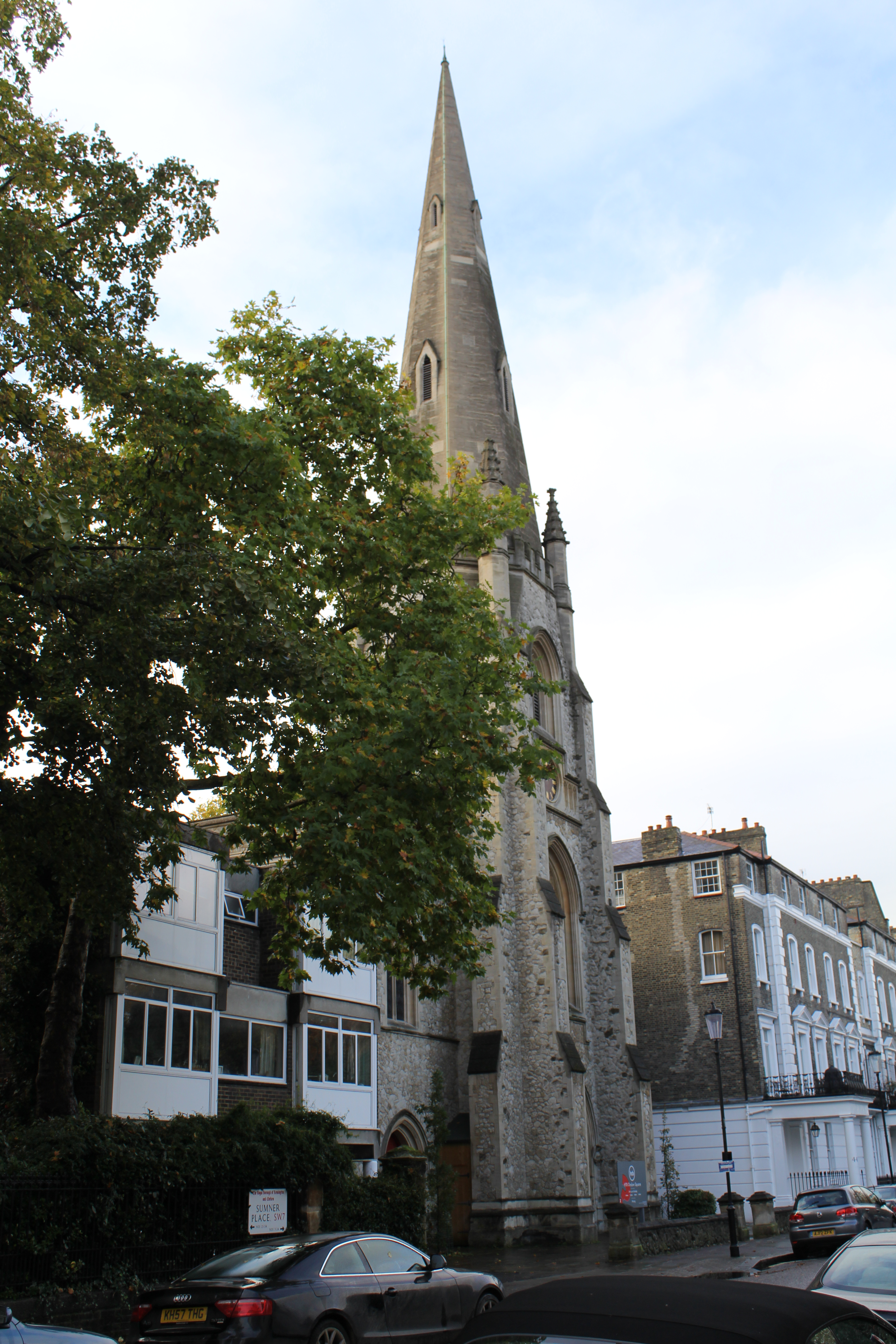
- St Paul's, Onslow Square
- 51.4916°N 0.1746°W
- OS grid reference: TQ 26821 78536
- Location: Onslow Square, London
- Country: England
- Denomination: Church of England
- Churchmanship: Evangelical
- Website: https://www.htb.org/onslow-square-services

Architecture
- Architect: James Edmeston
- Years built: 1860

Administration
- Diocese: London
- Archdeaconry: Middlesex
- Deanery: Chelsea
- Parish: Holy Trinity Brompton with St Paul's, Onslow Square and St Augustine's, South Kensington

Clergy
- Vicar: Archie Coates

St Paul's, Onslow Square (known as HTB Onslow Square), is a Grade II listed Anglican church in Onslow Square, South Kensington, London, England. The church was built in 1860, and the architect was James Edmeston. Composer William Carter was appointed organist at the church in 1868. Hanmer William Webb-Peploe (1837–1923), the evangelical clergyman, and member of the Holiness Movement, was the vicar for 43 years from 1876 to 1919.

In the late 1970s, the parish of Holy Trinity Brompton (HTB) merged with the neighbouring parish of St Paul's, Onslow Square. St Paul's was declared redundant. An attempt by the Diocese of London to sell the building for private redevelopment was thwarted in the early 1980s when local residents joined with churchgoers to save the church. In the late 1980s, the Parochial Church Council requested that the redundancy be overturned which allowed curate Nicky Lee and his wife Sila to plant a congregation there as well as undertake some building structural maintenance work.

In 1997, the congregation at St Paul's divided into three, with some going with curate Stuart Lees to plant a church in Fulham; others returning to HTB with Nicky and Sila Lee; and others forming the St Paul's Anglican Fellowship and remaining based at St Paul's with John Peters. This last group left in 2002 to plant into St Mary's, Bryanston Square.

During 2007, after plans by HTB to rebuild the 1960s offices were withdrawn following difficulty in getting support from local residents, HTB decided to undertake some renovations and to resume services in the church. St Paul's launched 9 am and 6 pm services in September 2007 and followed with an 11 am service on 20 January 2008 and a 4 pm service on 28 September 2009. In December 2009 the upstairs balcony was recommissioned for worship, having previously been used for administrative offices (the office occupants having moved to HTB's nearby office building purchased in 2008).

The church holds services at 10.30 am, 4.30 pm and 6.30 pm every Sunday.
