= Holy Trinity Brompton =

Church in London, England

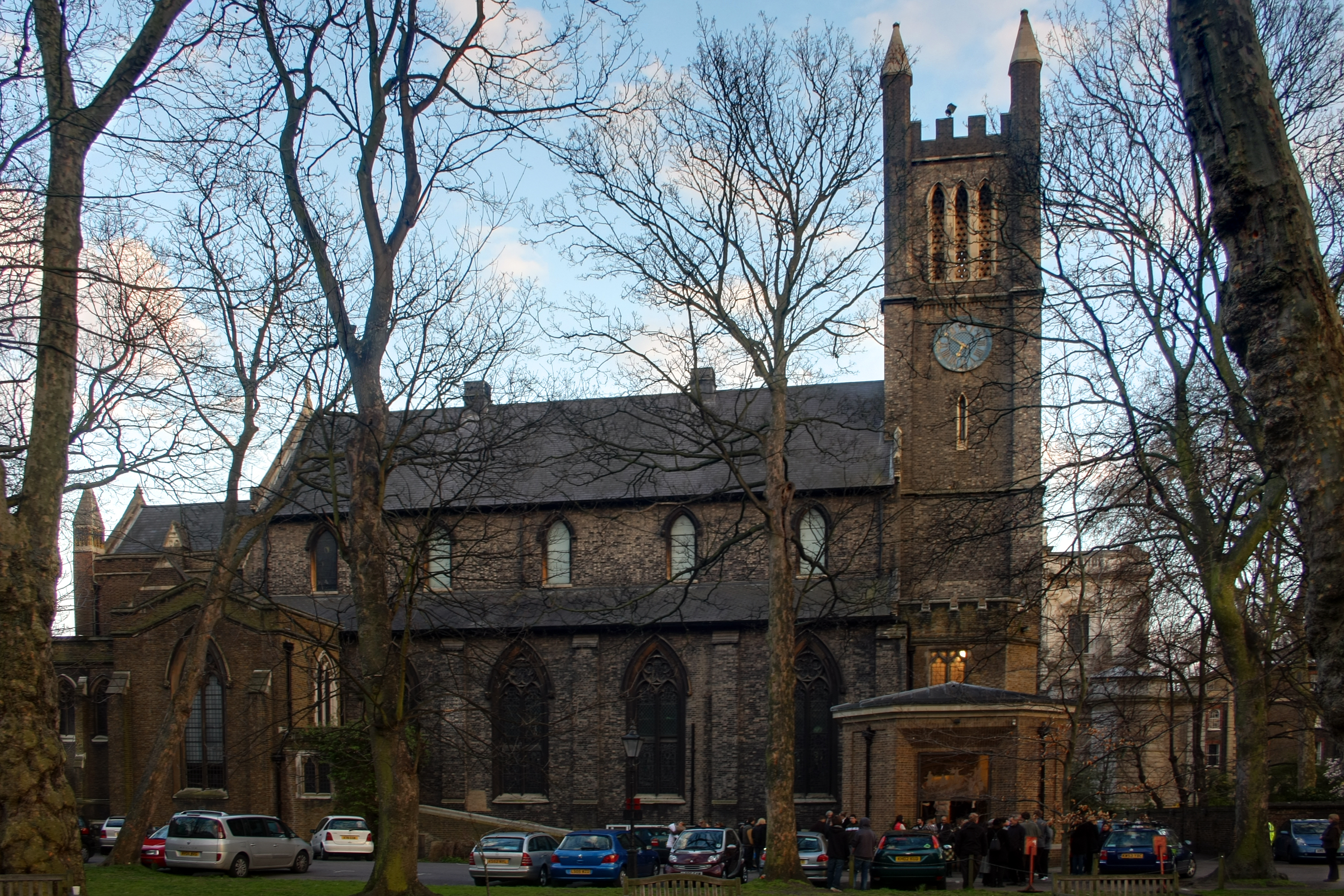
- Holy Trinity, Brompton Road
- Holy Trinity Brompton
- 51.4978°N 0.1700°W
- Location: Knightsbridge
- Country: England
- Denomination: Church of England
- Churchmanship: Charismatic evangelical Anglican
- Website: htb.org

History
- Dedicated: 1829

Architecture
- Architect: Thomas Leverton Donaldson
- Style: Gothic Revival
- Years built: 1826–1829

Administration
- Diocese: London
- Archdeaconry: Middlesex
- Deanery: Chelsea

Clergy
- Vicar: Archie Coates

Holy Trinity Brompton with St Paul's Onslow Square and St Augustine's South Kensington, often referred to simply as HTB, is an Anglican church in London, England.

The church consists of six sites: HTB Brompton Road, HTB Onslow Square (formerly St Paul's, Onslow Square), HTB Queen's Gate (formerly St Augustine's, South Kensington), HTB Courtfield Gardens (formerly St Jude's Church, Kensington – officially in the parish of St Mary of the Bolton's but part of HTB). It is also the home of the St Paul's Theological Centre, HTB St Francis Dalgarno Way, and St Luke's Earls Court. It is where the Alpha Course was first developed.

The church buildings accommodate courses, conferences, meetings, and ten services each Sunday. HTB's stated aims are to "play our part in the evangelization of the nations, the revitalization of the church and the transformation of society."

Bishop Sandy Millar was succeeded in July 2005 by Nicky Gumbel as vicar of HTB, followed by Archie Coates in September 2022. HTB's associate vicar is Katherine Chow, who succeeded Nicky Lee and Martyn Layzell.

== History ==
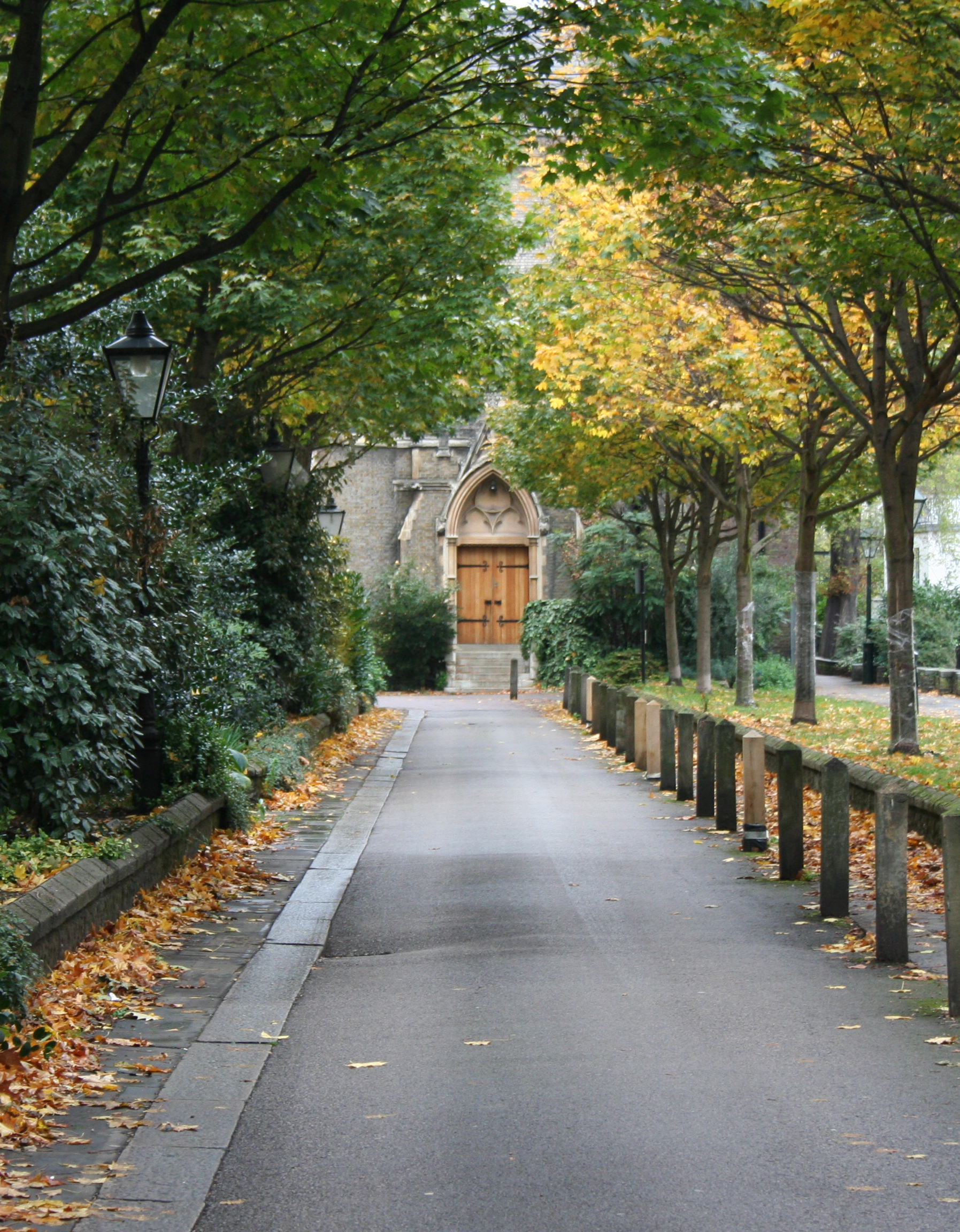
Holy Trinity Brompton's driveway

=== Holy Trinity Church ===
Prior to the construction of Holy Trinity Brompton, the present site was a part of the large parish of Kensington, which was served only by the nearby St Mary Abbots Church. In the early 1820s, the area was in the midst of a substantial population increase, so a decision was taken to purchase the land and construct a new church.

The church was a Commissioners' church, receiving a grant from the Church Building Commission towards its cost. The full cost of the church was £10,407 (equivalent to £950,000 in 2025), towards which the Commission paid £7,407. The architect was Thomas Leverton Donaldson. Holy Trinity is a Grade II listed building.

After three years of construction, the church was consecrated on 6 June 1829 by the Bishop of London. The same building stands today, although it has been considerably modified. In 1852 a portion of Holy Trinity Brompton's land was sold to the Roman Catholic Church to build the Brompton Oratory. This created the long driveway from Brompton Road to the relative tranquil of HTB.

The most recent major modification was during the 1980s when HTB's crypt was rebuilt to provide meeting rooms and space for a bookshop. Also during this time, the pews were removed and replaced with chairs to allow greater flexibility in seating arrangements.

In 2023, leaders of HTB including its vicar, Archie Coates, and former vicar Nicky Gumbel, were among 27 signatories to a letter arguing against blessings for same-sex couples, known as Prayers of Love and Faith. Some worshippers at HTB Queen's Gate expressed "extreme disquiet" at the letter, from which they wished to "strongly disassociate" themselves, calling the letter a "cleverly worded delaying tactic" to "prolong discrimination". A priest at one HTB 'church-plant' said that many of the plants unhappy with this stance are "keeping quiet out of fear of repercussions".

==== List of vicars ====
- Joseph Holden Pott 1829–1840
- Percival Frye 1829–1835
- Robert Samuel Battiscombe 1835–1840
- William Josiah Irons 1840–1870
- Thomas Fraser Stooks 1870–1872
- Arthur Brook 1872–1877
- William Covington 1877–1899
- Alfred William Gough 1899–1931
- William Marshall Selwyn 1931–1938
- Bryan Stuart Westmacott Green 1938–1948
- Patrick Nevile Gilliat 1949–1969
- Raymond John Walton Morris 1969–1975
- Raymond Hilton Turvey 1975–1980
- John Theodore Cameron Bucke Collins 1980–1985
- John Alexander Kirkpatrick Millar 1985–2005
- Nicholas Glyn Paul Gumbel 2005–2022
- Archie Coates 2022–

=== St Paul's Onslow Square ===
St Paul's Church in Onslow Square was opened in 1860. In the late 1970s, the parish of Holy Trinity Brompton merged with the neighbouring parish of St Paul's Onslow Square. St Paul's was declared redundant. An attempt by the diocese to sell the building for private redevelopment was thwarted in the early 1980s when local residents joined with churchgoers to save the church. In the late 1980s, the Parochial Church Council requested that the redundancy be overturned which allowed curate Nicky Lee and his wife Sila to "plant" a congregation there as well as undertake some building structural maintenance work. At its peak in the 1990s, this congregation had grown to several hundred.

In 1997, the congregation at St Paul's divided into three, with some going with curate Stuart Lees to plant a church in Fulham; others returning to Holy Trinity with Prebendary Nicky Lee and his wife, Sila; and others forming the St Paul's Anglican Fellowship and remaining based at St Paul's with John Peters. This last group left in 2002 to plant into St Mary's, Bryanston Square.

During 2007, after plans by HTB to rebuild the 1960s offices were withdrawn following difficulty in getting support from local residents, HTB decided to undertake some renovations and to resume services in the church. St Paul's launched 9:00 a.m. and 6:00 p.m. services in September 2007 and followed with an 11 a.m. service on 20 January 2008 and a 4 p.m. service on 28 September 2009. In December 2009 the upstairs balcony was recommissioned for worship, having previously been used for administrative offices (the office occupants having moved to HTB's nearby office building purchased in 2008).

=== St Augustine's Church ===
Services at St Augustine's, Queen's Gate, began to be administered from Holy Trinity Brompton following an invitation by the Bishop of Kensington in 2010, where Nicky Gumbel was appointed priest-in-charge. In March 2011, St Augustine's was formally merged into the parish of HTB.

=== Church plants ===
Since the 1980s, HTB has been involved in planting churches. This has resulted in a large number of churches that can be linked back to HTB either as a result of being directly planted by the church (so-called daughter churches), or by being the plants of churches planted by HTB (so called granddaughter churches). This web of churches form the HTB network.

Church Plants Overseas:

- Holy Trinity Bukit Bintang, Kuala Lumpur, Malaysia
- Holy Trinity Kuching, Kuching, Malaysia

== Alpha and HTB ==
The Alpha course was founded by clergy at HTB who, over a period of twenty years, kept adapting the programme in accordance with feedback until in the early 1990s, when the Alpha course started gaining worldwide attention. As Alpha grew it became the main focus for HTB as it sought to support Alpha's spread and growth.

Today, this involves the production of advertising material and course material such as videos, books and tapes for each Alpha session and leader training material. Alpha is now run as a separate enterprise with separate fundraising and accounting, but it remains closely tied to HTB, with most of Alpha's staff being accommodated in HTB's offices. The clergy of HTB also share Alpha duties such as overseeing Alpha conferences and training events in the UK and overseas.

Since the mid-1990s, the Alpha course programme has remained largely unchanged allowing the energy of the church to develop other initiatives which fit with the Alpha course such as creating courses on marriage preparation, parenting teenagers, bereavement and recovering from divorce, as well as publishing new books.

HTB itself runs Alpha courses three times a year, and with these attracting 300–400 guests during each course, they require all of the available space in the church buildings.

== Pastoral care ==
In order to address the problem of how to give pastoral care to such a large congregation as well as provide a means for new people to join the church, HTB uses the 'Pastorate' model.

Pastorates consist of 20–50 people who, through meeting at least once a fortnight, can form strong friendships and support each other in care as well as developing individual gifts and ministries.

HTB has quite a transient congregation caused in part by its location in London, a city which itself has a transient population, in particular a large student population who only reside in London during their studies, and that HTB is able to attract; and also in part by the fact that the Alpha course brings in a number of people to HTB who are either visiting the home of Alpha or have completed the course and then quickly move on to other churches or ministries.

== Services ==
HTB conducts ten services each Sunday across the six sites. The family services include items aimed at children. The formal services feature traditional Church of England liturgy and a professional choir. The informal services centre on a longer period of contemporary worship with a longer talk and close in a reflective prayer mood which extends beyond the end of the service.

Some services reuse the same talk and song list from a service earlier in the day.

== Other activities ==
Another activity of HTB is its yearly church camp, named "Focus". This takes place over five days in July where typically 7,000 people attend and involve themselves in the many seminars, workshops and recreational activities. The size also attracts some prominent speakers to speak on issues affecting the church and society.

Since 1985, HTB has been actively involved in a process called church planting whereby struggling churches are boosted by scores – sometimes hundreds – of people committing to move from HTB to the identified church for at least a year. This also involves at least one member of HTB's clergy similarly moving to the new church to help lead worship, form pastorates and run local Alpha courses. Over the years, multiple churches have been planted in this way, including St Gabriel's, Cricklewood, with some of these churches going on to make church plants of their own.

HTB also has thriving children's, youth and student ministries. Other activities HTB undertakes are services twice a year involving the large HTB choir – at Easter and Christmas – and several free classical concerts that utilise the church's pipe organ, refurbished in 2004, as well as drawing on the talent of the nearby music colleges.

In September 2005 HTB started providing the talks given at the Sunday services as free downloads from its website and through their iTunes, YouTube and SoundCloud account. These downloads, which HTB has termed HTB Podcasts, have proved popular and, more recently, other talks specifically provided for the HTB Podcast community have also been offered, including answers to questions sent in by listeners. Each month the total download count from this catalogue of talks is over 40,000, with some talks making it into the top ten in the "Religion and Spirituality" section for iTunes.

In 2011 HTB formed the William Wilberforce Trust to bring together various social action projects that were linked with HTB. These projects include work in deprived neighbourhoods, addressing homelessness and providing practical support for people with addictions.

HTB is also home to:

- St Paul's Theological Centre
- The Alpha Course

== See also ==
- Brompton Oratory
- List of Commissioners' churches in London
