= Early life and career of Rab Butler (1902–1929) =

The Right Honourable R. A. Butler MP
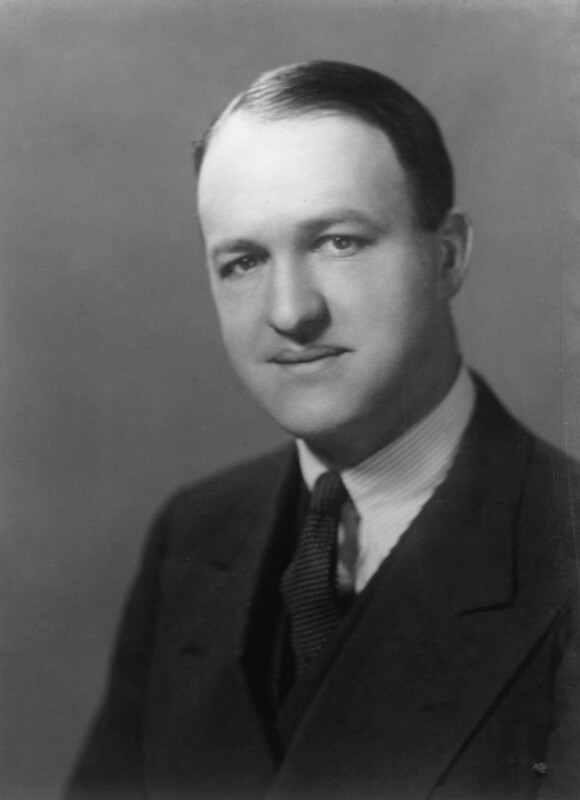
- 1934 photograph of Butler
- Born: Richard Austen Butler; 9 December 1902; Attock Serai, British India (now Attock, Pakistan)
- Died: 8 March 1982 (aged 79); Great Yeldham, Essex, England
- Other name: Rab
- Education: Pembroke College, Cambridge
- Political party: Conservative
- Spouse: Sydney Elizabeth Courtauld (m. 1926; died 1954)
- Parent: Montagu Sherard Dawes Butler (father)

Member of Parliament for Saffron Walden
- In office 30 May 1929 – 19 February 1965
- Preceded by: William Mitchell
- Succeeded by: Peter Kirk
Ministerial offices
Under Secretary of State for Foreign Affairs
In office 25 February 1938 – 20 July 1941 Serving with The Earl of Plymouth (1938–1940)
Prime Minister	Neville Chamberlain; Winston Churchill
Sec. of State	The Viscount Halifax; Anthony Eden
Preceded by	The Viscount Cranborne
Succeeded by	Richard Law
Parliamentary Secretary to the Ministry of Labour
In office 28 May 1937 – 25 February 1938
Prime Minister	Neville Chamberlain
Minister	Ernest Brown
Preceded by	Anthony Muirhead
Succeeded by	Alan Lennox-Boyd
Under Secretary of State for India
In office 29 September 1932 – 28 May 1937
Prime Minister	Ramsay MacDonald; Stanley Baldwin
Sec. of State	Sir Samuel Hoare; The Marquess of Zetland
Preceded by	The Marquess of Lothian
Succeeded by	The Lord Stanley

Richard Austen Butler (9 December 1902 – 8 March 1982), generally known as R. A. Butler and familiarly known from his initials as Rab, was a prominent British Conservative Party politician.

Butler was born in British India to a family of distinguished Cambridge University academics. As a child, his right hand was permanently disabled in a riding accident. He was educated at Marlborough College and at Cambridge, where he was president of the Cambridge Union Society and, after initially reading French and German, graduated with an outstanding first-class degree in history.

After graduating, he taught briefly as a Cambridge don and married into the wealthy Courtauld family. Butler was elected to Parliament for Saffron Walden in Essex at the 1929 general election and held the seat until his retirement from the House of Commons in 1965.

== Early life ==
Butler was born in Attock Khurd, Attock, British India, to Sir Montagu Sherard Dawes Butler of the Indian Civil Service and his wife, Anne Gertrude (née Smith). Butler's mother was the daughter of George Smith, who was Principal of the Doveton Boys College in Calcutta.

Butler's paternal family had a long and distinguished association with the University of Cambridge, which dated back to his great-grandfather George Butler. Especially notable were Butler's grand-uncle Henry Montagu Butler (Master of Trinity College and Dean of Gloucester) and Sir Geoffrey G. Butler, a Cambridge historian and Conservative MP for the university, Butler's uncle and a particular early influence on him. Butler's father was a Fellow, and in later life the Master, of Pembroke College.

In July 1909, at the age of six, his right arm was broken in three places in a riding accident. The injury was aggravated by a burn from a hot water bottle and an attempt to straighten the arm by hanging weights from it, which left his hand not fully functional. (Note: His limp handshake, lack of military experience and his stooping donnish manner (in an era when many politicians were former officers) were political handicaps in later life. Howard (p. 7) states that it made "any form of military service out of the question", a line followed by many biographers. However, despite his partial disability, Butler trained in his school cadet corps and passed at the top of his year in Corps Certificate A (Jago 2015, p.10) and was a competent recreational shot. He attempted to register for military service in May 1941.)

In September 1914 Butler attended, and remembered for the rest of his life, David Lloyd George's famous speech in support of the First World War at Queen's Hall.

Butler attended Brockhurst preparatory school but refused to attend Harrow, where many of his family had been educated. He failed to win a scholarship to Eton and so he attended Marlborough College. He left Marlborough at the end of 1920, a week after his 18th birthday, and spent five months in France with a Protestant pastor in Abbeville. He returned briefly to England to sit the exams for Pembroke College, Cambridge, where in June 1921, he won an exhibition worth £20 per annum (around £1,000 at 2014 prices), and he then returned to France to tutor the son of Robert de Rothschild. His plan at that stage was to enter the Diplomatic Service.

As a child of Empire, from his mid-teens onwards, Butler was expected to look after his younger siblings by arranging for them to stay with relatives during school holidays and by sending them Christmas presents, which he pretended had been sent by their parents. His sister was the writer Iris Mary Butler (1905–2002), who became Iris Portal upon her marriage, and her elder daughter was Jane Williams, Baroness Williams of Elvel, the mother of Justin Welby, the Archbishop of Canterbury. Butler's younger brother, Jock, a Home Office civil servant and Pilot Officer, was killed in a plane crash in January 1943.

== Cambridge ==
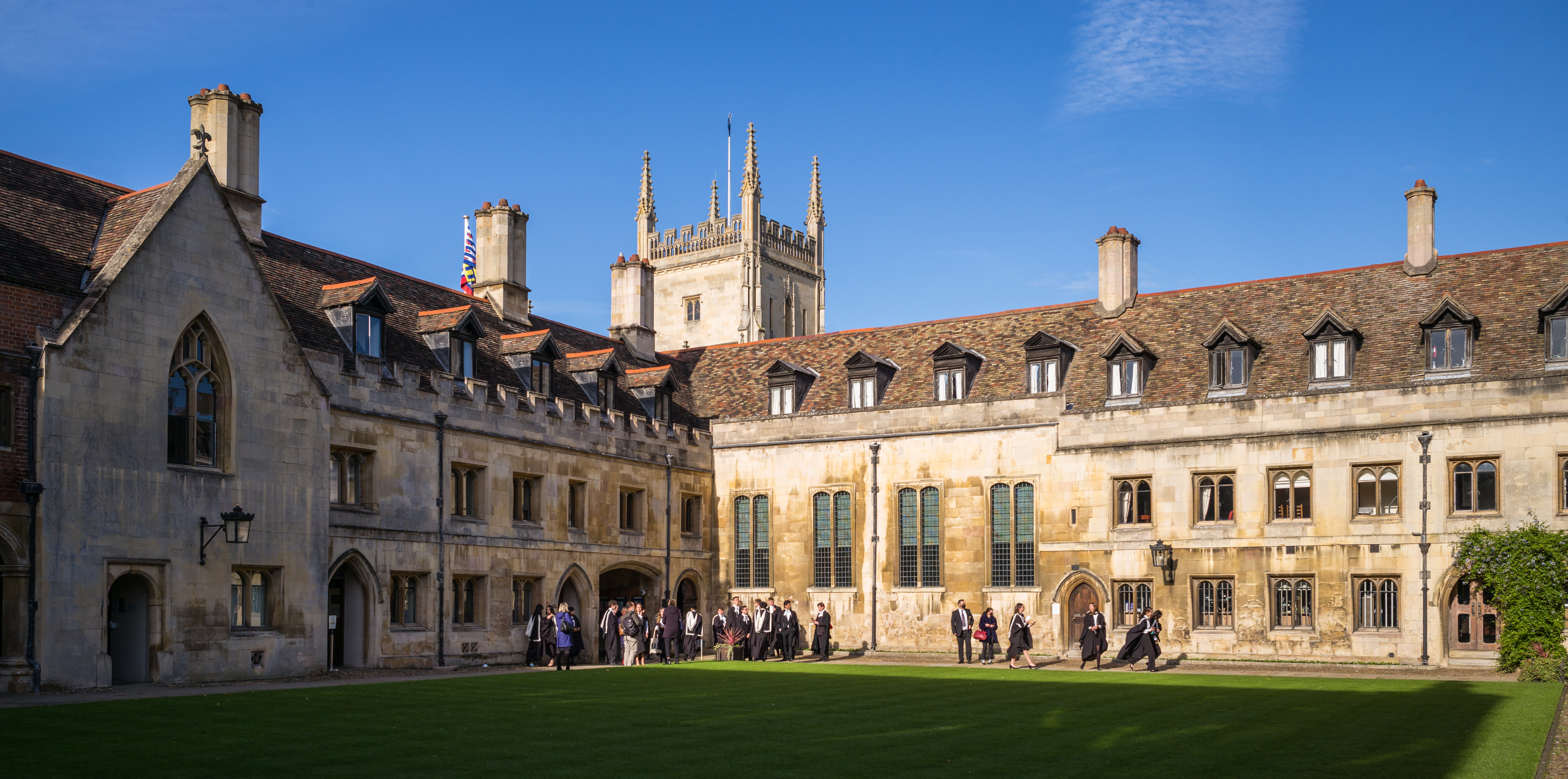
Pembroke College, Cambridge

Butler studied at Pembroke College, Cambridge, starting in October 1921 and initially read Medieval and Modern Languages. He soon became active in student politics and was elected to the Committee of the Cambridge Union Society by the end of his first year. At the end of his second year, he was elected Secretary for Michaelmas (autumn) term 1923 at his second attempt, by the narrow margin of 10 votes out of 500. At that time, Secretary was the only office normally contested, which put him on track to be vice-president for Lent 1924 and President for Easter (summer) term 1924. At the end of his second year, in June 1923, he achieved a First in French Part I and was awarded an £80 scholarship to supplement his £300 parental allowance (approximately £4,000 and £15,000 at 2014 prices).

Butler suffered a nervous breakdown that summer and had to postpone his plans to study History to a fourth year. He took a less strenuous course in German in the meantime. He spent part of the summer of 1923 abroad learning German, became unusually fluent in the language and impressed his hosts with his near-native syntax. He also came to feel that the Germans had been harshly treated by the recent Treaty of Versailles.

In Michaelmas 1923, as Secretary, he persuaded the Cambridge Union to affiliate to the National Union of Students of which he became a vice-president. Psychiatric illness was then still little understood. In November 1923, his college put him in the care of a doctor, and in December 1923, his uncle Cyril sent him to a specialist in Bristol. Butler made a recovery from his breakdown. On 11 March 1924, after taking office as president of the Cambridge Union, he entertained the Leader of the Opposition, Stanley Baldwin, at the Change of Officers Debate to oppose the motion that "This House has the Highest Regard for Rhetoric". The following morning, Rab had to escort Baldwin back to the railway station, where, according to one version of the story, Baldwin bought him a copy of Something Fresh by P. G. Wodehouse with an admonition not to take life too seriously. (Note: Baldwin's career at Harrow and Trinity, Cambridge, had suffered from a poor relationship with one of Butler's relatives, Henry Montagu Butler. Winston Churchill (then out of Parliament and an independent "Constitutionalist" candidate in the 19 March 1924 Westminster Abbey by-election) had agreed to speak in favour of the motion but had not been able to attend.) At the end of his third year (1924), he received a Second in German. He graduated as a BA in 1924. (Note: Howard quotes a letter from his father, who was openly disappointed and is clear that Butler was awarded his BA that summer despite his being about to stay on for a further year of undergraduate study (a student at Cambridge normally needs to pass a Part I and a Part II, not necessarily in the same subject, to obtain a BA). Jago (2015, p.30) states that his third year counted only as "General Studies" but that he needed a fourth year to obtain Honours.)

In the summer of 1924, Butler took part in the ESU USA Tour, a seven-week debating tour of Canada and the United States that was organised by the English-Speaking Union. They debated two motions: democracy versus personal liberty and closer relations with the Soviet Union. (Note: Anglo-Soviet relations were extremely topical throughout the 1920s, and especially in 1924. Ramsay MacDonald's first Labour Government had formally recognised the Soviet Union, which was then an international pariah state, in February. Later in the year the Labour Government controversially attempted to negotiate a trade agreement and a loan to the Soviets, in exchange for agreement on pre-war Russian debts which the Soviets had repudiated. The Campbell Case began that summer and caused the fall of the government, and the Zinoviev Letter and Labour's alleged softness towards the Soviets were major issues in the Conservatives' landslide victory at the election that October.)

During his fourth year at Cambridge (1924–1925), he concentrated on study, reading for Part II in History and International Law. He used notes which his uncle Geoffrey had prepared for a planned book on International Law. He later recorded that in his International Law exam, he had been dissatisfied with his essays, and at half time, he tore up his answers and wrote six fresh ones on six sheets of foolscap. In History, he took the Peel special subject and at one point knew by name the way that every Conservative MP voted during the split over the Irish Coercion Bill of 1846. He received one of the highest firsts in the university across all subjects, which was known at the time as a "I:I".

After graduating, Butler became a fellow of Corpus Christi College, Cambridge. He gave lectures on the politics of the French Third Republic.

== Private and family life ==
Butler married Sydney Elizabeth Courtauld on 20 April 1926. She was the daughter of Samuel Courtauld and the heiress to part of the Courtauld textile fortune. His father-in-law awarded him a private income of £5,000 a year after tax for life, the equivalent of a Cabinet Minister's salary and equivalent to almost £260,000 at 2014 prices. (Note: Although backbench MPs were then paid less than today in real terms, Cabinet ministers were paid more than now.)

The Butlers lived at Stanstead Hall, and in 1938, they moved into 3 Smith Square, which remained as Butler's London base throughout his career. During the Second World War, Butler was bombed out of Smith Square and stayed with his Parliamentary Private Secretary Henry "Chips" Channon in Belgrave Square.

The Butlers had four children:

- Sir Richard C. Butler Kt DL (1929–2012), president (1979–86) of the National Farmers' Union of England and Wales;
- Adam Courtauld Butler (1931–2008), who was also a politician;
- Samuel James Butler (1936–2015); and
- Sarah Teresa Butler (born 1944).

After the death of his wife from cancer in 1954, Butler married Mollie Courtauld (née Montgomerie) on 21 October 1959. She had been married to Augustine Courtauld (Sydney's cousin), who had died in March 1959.

The Butlers inherited Gatcombe Park from Samuel Courtauld in 1949. In 1976, it was sold to the Queen as a home for Princess Anne, for a sum between £300,000 and £750,000 (Howard gives the figure as "more than £500,000"). He recorded that the Royal Family had driven a hard bargain but joked in public that he was "glad it was going to a good family".

== Early political career ==
In his autobiography, The Art of the Possible, Butler attributed his political gifts to his grandmother Mary Kendall of Pelyn, Lostwithiel, Cornwall. He wrote a lengthy paragraph on the Kendall family, which had served in Parliament since 1368 and had been active in politics for many generations. It has been remarked of his family that it has perhaps sent more members to the British Parliament than any other in the United Kingdom.

In summer 1926, Butler resigned his residential Cambridge fellowship to go on a honeymoon tour of the world and became instead a supernumerary fellow. He renewed his contact with Leo Amery, whom he had met in July 1924 at a British Empire Students Conference and now put him in touch with contacts in Australia, New Zealand and Canada. In Vancouver in June 1927, he learned of a vacancy for the safe Conservative seat of Saffron Walden, and returned from Quebec by sea on 31 August 1927. Courtauld connections arranged for him to be selected unopposed as the Conservative candidate on 26 November 1927. Butler toured local villages and showed films of his Empire tours.

Butler was elected in the 1929 general election and retained the seat until his retirement from politics in 1965.

== Sources ==
- Howard, Anthony (1987). RAB: The Life of R. A. Butler. Jonathan Cape. ISBN 978-0-224-01862-3.
- Jago, Michael (2015). Rab Butler: The Best Prime Minister We Never Had?. Biteback Publishing. ISBN 978-1849549202.
- Gilmour, Ian (2004). Matthew, Colin (ed.). R.A Butler (1902–1982) in Dictionary of National Biography. Vol. 9. Oxford University Press. ISBN 978-0198614111.

=== Primary sources ===
- Butler, Rab (1971). The Art of the Possible. London: Hamish Hamilton. ISBN 978-0241020074. His autobiography
- Butler, Rab (1982). The Art of Memory. London: Hodder And Stoughton. ISBN 978-0340264973.
