= Jane Williams, Lady Williams of Elvel =

Personal secretary to Winston Churchill

The Right Honourable The Baroness Williams of Elvel
- Born: Jane Gillian Portal; 11 December 1929 near Delhi, British India, British Empire
- Died: 15 July 2023 (aged 93); London, England
- Occupation: Secretary
- Title: Personal secretary to Winston Churchill
- Term: December 1949 – April 1955
- Spouse(s): Gavin Bramhall James Welby (m. 1955; div. 1959) Charles Williams, Baron Williams of Elvel (m. 1975; died 2019)
- Children: Justin Welby
- Parent(s): Gervas Edward Portal; Iris Mary Butler
- Relatives: Charles Portal, 1st Viscount Portal of Hungerford (uncle); Rab Butler, Baron Butler of Saffron Walden (uncle); Dorothy Middleton (aunt); Sir Montagu Sherard Dawes Butler (grandfather)

Jane Gillian Williams, Baroness Williams of Elvel (née Portal; 11 December 1929 – 15 July 2023), formerly Jane Welby, was a British government worker. She served as a personal secretary to Sir Winston Churchill from 1949 to 1955. While working as Churchill's secretary, she accompanied him to the airport in 1952 to greet a young Elizabeth II upon her return to the United Kingdom from the Kenya Colony following the death of George VI. Lady Williams wrote down the speech dictated by Churchill for his later address to the nation concerning the death of the king.

Lady Williams was married twice. Her first husband was Gavin Bramhall James Welby. During this marriage, she gave birth to Justin Welby, who later became the Archbishop of Canterbury. In 2016, it was revealed that her son was fathered by Sir Anthony Montague Browne, with whom she worked in Churchill's administration at 10 Downing Street and with whom she had an affair in 1955. She divorced Welby in 1959. She married a second time, in 1975, to Charles Cuthbert Powell Williams, who was created a life peer in 1985.

== Early life and family ==
Lady Williams was born Jane Gillian Portal in the British Raj, near Delhi, on 11 December 1929 to Lieutenant-Colonel Gervas Edward Portal and the journalist and historian Iris Mary Butler.

She was of Huguenot descent and brought up in an affluent intellectual and political family. Her father was the half-brother of Charles Portal, 1st Viscount Portal of Hungerford. Lady Williams was a niece of Conservative politician Rab Butler and of the writer and geographer Dorothy Middleton. She was a cousin of Conservative politician Adam Butler and crossbench peeress Rosemary Portal, 2nd Baroness Portal of Hungerford. Lady Williams' maternal grandfather was Sir Montagu Sherard Dawes Butler, who served as Governor of the Central Provinces and Lieutenant governor of the Isle of Man. Her grandmother, Lady Butler, was the daughter of the historian George Smith and a sister of Sir George Adam Smith, Lieutenant Colonel Sir James Dunlop Smith, and Lieutenant Colonel Charles Aitchison Smith. Through her grandfather, Lady Williams was also the great-great-granddaughter of George Butler, the headmaster of Harrow School and Dean of Peterborough, the great-great-great-granddaughter of Weeden Butler, the great-grandniece of The Reverend Canon George Butler and Josephine Butler, and the great-great-grandniece of The Right Reverend John Colenso, the first Bishop of Natal.

== Career ==
Lady Williams served as a personal secretary to Winston Churchill from December 1949 until April 1955. Churchill hired her when she was twenty-two years old, following a typical cursory interview. She began working for him at his home, 28 Hyde Park Gate, and was the junior of several other young women employed by Churchill. She was responsible for dictation, typing, and filing paperwork and handled personal chores including taking Churchill's poodle, Rufus, to the dog spa, ordering paints, and handling the post. Following his elected as Prime Minister of the United Kingdom, Lady Williams worked for Churchill at 10 Downing Street.

In 1952, she accompanied Churchill as he was driven to the airport to greet Elizabeth II upon her return from Kenya following the death of her father, George VI. Lady Williams wrote down the speech Churchill dictated that he would later broadcast to the nation.

After Churchill suffered a stroke in 1953, she read to him and assisted him in his return to public life with a speech to the Conservative Party at Margate. She left 10 Downing Street in 1955 just prior to her first marriage.

Following her divorce from her first husband, she returned to work, first as probation officer and later as a secretary for a professor at Imperial College London.

Lady Williams was later interviewed by Cita Stelzer for her books Dinner With Churchill: Policy-Making at the Dinner Table and Working with Winston: The Unsung Women Behind Britain’s Greatest Statesman.

In 2007, she spoke at the Churchill War Rooms.

In 2017, Lady Williams attended the International Churchill Conference in New York City and gave an address to the attendees, with Celia Sandys serving as moderator.

== Personal life ==
During the last year Lady Williams worked for Churchill, she had a brief affair with his private secretary Sir Anthony Montague Browne. Lady Williams and Browne were ninth cousins once-removed, as descendants of John Erskine, Earl of Mar and eleventh cousins twice-removed as descendants of James V of Scotland.

In April 1955, she married Gavin Bramhall James Welby. On 6 January 1956, she gave birth to a son, Justin Portal Welby. A paternity test undertaken in 2016 revealed that Welby was not the biological son of Gavin Welby, but of Browne.

She obtained a divorce from her first husband in 1959 and, in 1975, married a second time to the merchant banker Charles Cuthbert Powell Williams. Her husband, who later served as the Chairman of the Price Commission, was created a life peer in 1985. Upon her husband's elevation to the peerage, she was entitled to the style and title The Right Honourable The Lady Williams of Elvel.

She died on 15 July 2023.
