= Charles Williams, Baron Williams of Elvel =

British politician

The Right Honourable The Lord Williams of Elvel CBE PC
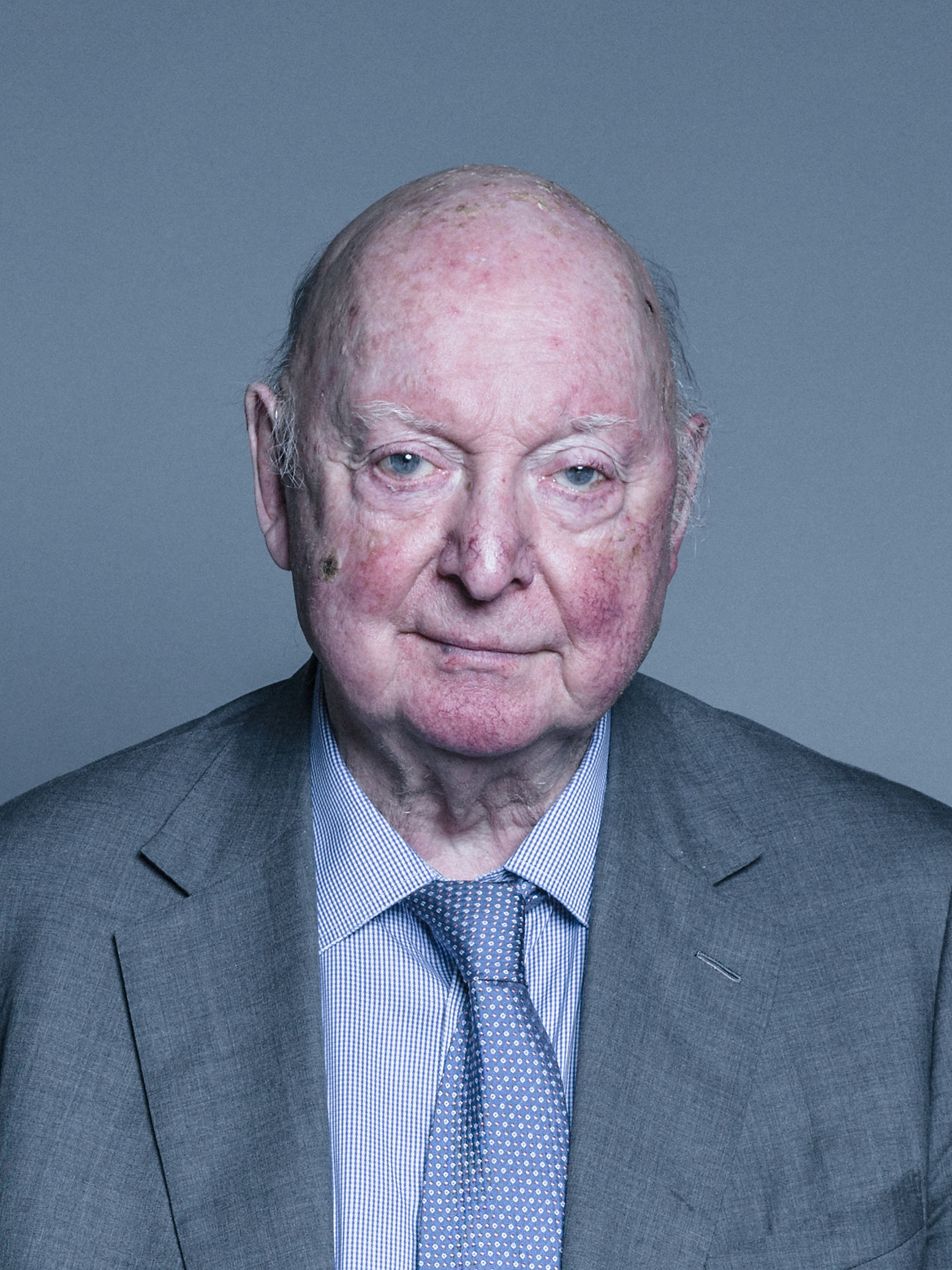

Member of the House of Lords
- Lord Temporal
- Life peerage 22 May 1985 – 30 December 2019

Chairman of the Price Commission
- In office 1977–1979

Personal details
- Born: Charles Cuthbert Powell Williams; 9 February 1933 Oxford, England
- Died: 30 December 2019 (aged 86) London, England
- Party: Labour
- Spouse: Jane Gillian Portal
- Education: Christ Church, Oxford; London School of Economics
- Profession: Businessman
- Cricket career

Cricket information
- Batting: Right-handed
- Role: Batsman

Domestic team information
- Years: Team
- 1952–1955: Oxford University
- 1954–1959: Essex
- FC debut: 4 June 1952 Oxford University v Sussex
- Last FC: 7 August 1959 Essex v Gloucestershire

Career statistics
Competition	First-class
Matches	87
Runs scored	4,090
Batting average	28.20
100s/50s	6/19
Top score	139*
Balls bowled	75
Wickets	1
Bowling average	61.00
5 wickets in innings	0
10 wickets in match	0
Best bowling	1/33
Catches/stumpings	60/–
- Source: CricketArchive, 21 August 2009

Charles Cuthbert Powell Williams, Baron Williams of Elvel, CBE, PC (9 February 1933 – 30 December 2019) was a British business executive, Labour life peer and member of the House of Lords. In his 20s he played first-class cricket while at university and for several seasons afterwards. He was the stepfather of Justin Welby, the Archbishop of Canterbury.

== Early life ==
Williams was born on 9 February 1933, the son of Dr Norman Powell Williams (died 1943), DD, Lady Margaret Professor of Divinity at the University of Oxford from 1927 to his death in 1943 and Canon of Christ Church, and Muriel de Lérisson Cazenove (died 1979), from a landed gentry family. His mother's brother was Brigadier Arnold de Lérisson Cazenove.

He was educated at Westminster School and at Christ Church, Oxford, where he received a Bachelor of Arts in literae humaniores in 1955 and a Master of Arts. Williams was further educated at the London School of Economics, where he graduated with a Bachelor of Science in 1964. Between 1955 and 1957, he served as Subaltern in the Headquarters of the King's Royal Rifle Corps in Winchester and in the regiment's 1st Battalion in Derna in Libya.

== Cricket career ==
A right-handed middle order batsman, Williams played 87 first-class cricket matches, 40 of them for Essex and 42 for Oxford University.

He made his first-class debut for Oxford University about halfway through the 1952 university cricket season and hit 53 in his first match, against Sussex in The Parks. In the return match at Worthing, he made 74, but he did not retain his place and he was not selected for the University Match against Cambridge. When the university cricket season was over, Williams played for Oxfordshire in the Minor Counties.

In 1953, Williams played regularly for the university side and in the match against Free Foresters, an itinerant amateur side of varying quality whose matches against the universities were considered first-class at this time, he made his first century, scoring 115 in a match ruined by rain. In the University Match, he made 40 and 5 as Oxford lost by two wickets in a close finish.

The 1954 season saw Williams achieve 1,000 runs in the season for the first time: he finished with 1128 at an average of 30.48 runs per innings. He was particularly successful for Oxford University, batting generally at No 3 and scoring 115 against Lancashire and then an unbeaten 139 followed by 89 in the second innings in the match against Hampshire. He was not successful in the University Match, batting just once and scoring 14. Later in the summer, he played in 11 matches for Essex, but his highest score for the county was only 54.

Williams was captain of the Oxford University cricket team in his final year at the university, 1955. The team was not successful, failing to win any of its first-class matches, and Williams' captaincy attracted some criticism in Wisden Cricketers' Almanack. "The weather was certainly against them, and in all their ten home games none was played through without some interference from rain and, altogether, nine and a half days of playing time were lost," Wisden wrote. "That in itself may have undermined the determination of the side, though a more likely handicap to the individual players was the length of time C. C. P. Williams took to decide who would be in the XI to meet Cambridge. The freshmen were particularly affected and when the weeks passed and they were still playing for their places none of them was able to relax and play a natural game."

Williams started the season well with 120 in the first match, against Gloucestershire. But his form declined and Oxford had the worse of a drawn University Match, though Williams' own second innings 47 not out helped save the game for his side. After the university season was over, he again played for Essex, and scored his first century in County Championship cricket, making 119 and sharing a fourth-wicket partnership of 200 with Doug Insole in the match against Leicestershire at Leicester. The 1955 season was, in all, Williams' most successful: he made 1219 runs at an average of 31.25, both his highest seasonal aggregate and average.

In 1956 and 1957, Williams was on National Service. In the 1956 season, he played a couple of matches for the Combined Services cricket team, making an unbeaten 125 in the match against Warwickshire. There were also a few matches in this season for Essex and one for Marylebone Cricket Club (MCC) at Lord's; at the end of the season, he played in two matches at the Scarborough Festival, one for MCC against Yorkshire in which he was used unsuccessfully as an opening batsman, and the second the Gentlemen v Players match in which he made 0 and 1. These were his only games of representative cricket. In 1957, he played no first-class cricket at all.

Williams returned to first-class cricket in the second half of the 1958 season, playing 10 matches for Essex and adding what Wisden called "extra stability" to the county's batting. In 1959, he reappeared for four matches, but with no success, and these were his final first-class matches.

Williams had been an amateur cricketer and played for the Gentlemen against the Players. Social change after the Second World War led to a reaction against the cricketing concept of amateurism, often disparaged as "shamateurism", and in 1963 all first-class cricketers became nominally professional as, in effect, "Players". The last edition of the annual Gentlemen v Players fixture was at Scarborough in September 1962. The events leading to the abolition of amateurism are described by Williams in his 2012 book, Gentlemen & Players, appropriately subtitled The Death of Amateurism in Cricket.

== Business career ==
Williams worked for British Petroleum Co. Ltd from 1958 to 1964. From 1964 to 1966, he was personal assistant to the manager of the Guatemala branch of the Bank of London and Montreal and from 1966 to 1970, he was manager of mergers and acquisitions of Eurofinance SA Paris. For Baring Bros & Co. Ltd, he worked between 1970 and 1977, as managing director from 1971. From 1977 to 1979, he was chairman of the Price Commission and from 1985 to 1992 director of Mirror Group Newspapers plc. Between 1979 and 1982, he was managing director of Henry Ansbacher & Co. Ltd and between 1982 and 1985 of Henry Ansbacher Holdings.

== Public service ==
In the 1964 General Election, Williams stood unsuccessfully for Parliament as the Labour Party candidate for Colchester. In 1976 he unsuccessfully attempted to become the Labour candidate for the Vauxhall constituency.

From 1988 to 1990, Williams was chair of the Academy of St Martin-in-the-Fields and from 1989 to 1999 Busby trustee of Westminster School. For the Campaign for the Protection of Rural Wales (CPRW), he was president between 1989 and 1995, and had been immediate past president and vice-president as well as president of its Radnor branch since 1995. Appointed a Commander of the Order of the British Empire (CBE) in 1980, he was created a life peer on 22 May 1985 taking the title Baron Williams of Elvel, of Llansantffraed in Elvel in the County of Powys. He sat in the House of Lords as a Labour peer. In 2013 he was appointed to the Privy Council.

== Personal life ==
In 1975, he married Jane Gillian Portal (1929−2023). His stepson was Justin Welby, the 105th Archbishop of Canterbury. Welby described him as a supportive stepfather. Williams died from heart disease at his home in Chelsea, London, on 30 December 2019, at the age of 86.

== Works ==
- 1993: The Last Great Frenchman: A Life of General de Gaulle
- 1996: Bradman: An Australian Hero
- 2000: Adenauer: The Father of the New Germany
- 2005: Pétain. Winner of the 2006 Elizabeth Longford Prize for Historical Biography
- 2009: Harold Macmillan
- 2012: Gentlemen & Players: The Death of Amateurism in Cricket
