= Montagu Sherard Dawes Butler =

Pakistani politician

Sir Montagu Butler KCSI CB CIE CVO CBE

16th Lieutenant Governor of the Isle of Man
- In office 1933–1937
- Monarchs: George V Edward VIII; George VI
- Preceded by: Claude Hill
- Succeeded by: Earl Granville

Personal details
- Born: Montagu Sherard Dawes Butler; 19 May 1873
- Died: 7 November 1952 (aged 79)
- Spouse: Ann Gertrude Smith
- Children: Richard, Iris, Dorothy, John
- Education: Pembroke College, Cambridge

Sir Montagu Sherard Dawes Butler, KCSI, CB, CIE, CVO, CBE (19 May 1873 – 7 November 1952) was Governor of the Central Provinces of British India (1925–33), Lieutenant Governor of the Isle of Man (1933–37), and Master of Pembroke College, Cambridge (1937–48).

== Career ==
Born at Julian Hill, a grade II listed building in Harrow, London, to Spencer Percival Butler and Mary Kendall, Butler was educated at Haileybury and Pembroke College, Cambridge. He graduated with a double first, having also been President of the Cambridge Union Society in Easter (summer) Term 1895. He became a Fellow of Pembroke in 1895 and entered the Indian Civil Service in 1896, having come top in the entrance exam.

He was appointed a Companion of the Order of the Indian Empire in 1909. From 1912 to 1916 he was secretary of the Islington Commission on Public Services in India. He was appointed a Companion of the Order of the Bath in 1916, a Commander of the Royal Victorian Order in 1918 and a Commander of the Order of the British Empire on 30 December 1919; he was Deputy Commissioner for the Punjab at the time. In 1921 he became President of the Punjab Legislative Council.

He was appointed a Knight Bachelor in the 1924 Birthday Honours, and was further knighted as a Knight Commander of the Order of the Star of India in December of that year upon his appointment as Governor of the Central Provinces. He was President of the Council of State of India from 1924 to 1925 and Governor of the Central Provinces from 1925 to 1933, and during this same time was chancellor of Nagpur University.

Butler did not approve of the policies of Lord Irwin, whom he thought a "weak, well-meaning viceroy" for his moves towards greater Indian self-government. Whereas no Indians had been included in the Simon Commission of the late 1920s, Irwin wanted them involved in further talks, and issued the famous Irwin Declaration on 31 October 1929. Butler, by contrast, wrote to his son Rab (13 August 1930) that "There is nothing like a cut across the buttocks for checking religious emotions – I have generally ordered whipping for the low class people caught at this game". The first Round Table Conference began in November 1930. The Gandhi–Irwin Pact followed on 5 March 1931, followed by a release of prisoners. Butler had wanted to be an official delegate to the Round Table Conference and wrote of Gandhi (28 July 1931) "All this slobber over him disgusts me". The Second Round Table Conference began in September 1931, with the Indian Congress Party taking part.

Butler was passed over for two other major governorships. His son Rab, then Under-Secretary of State for India, lobbied Buckingham Palace and the Home Office for his father to be given a job. He returned to the British Isles and was appointed Lieutenant Governor of the Isle of Man on 1 May 1933. He held that post from 1933 to 1937, and was then Master of Pembroke College, Cambridge from 1937 to 1948.

Butler and his wife visited their son Rab, then Under-Secretary of State for Foreign Affairs, at the Foreign Office on 23 November 1938. The diarist Chips Channon, who was Rab's PPS, thought Sir Monty "a fat little fellow of sixty" but Lady Butler "a grand old girl". Butler was also Mayor of Cambridge for two years between 1941 and 1943.

Butler died on 7 November 1952. His obituary in The Times wrote of his "knack in the handling of men" and of how "ardent disciples of the Gandhian cult were turned into loyal supporters through the tonic effect of responsibility for administration". A memorial service was held at Pembroke on 15 November. The Nawab of Bhopal and the Maharao of Kota State wrote to Rab (who by then was Chancellor of the Exchequer) praising his "illustrious" father. Oliver Franks wrote to Rab that his father had been kind to him when he took over as Provost of Queen's College, Oxford in 1946. A recent Pembroke graduate wrote to tell Rab of the affection in which his father had been held.

Butler's estate was valued for probate in 1952 at £33,413 7s 1d (approximately £850,000 at 2015 prices).

== Family ==
His parents were Spencer Perceval Butler (son of George Butler, a former headmaster of Harrow School) and Mary, the only child of the Rev. Nicholas Kendall of Bodmin. His brothers included Sir Cyril Kendall Butler KBE, Sir Spencer Harcourt Butler, Sir George Geoffrey Gilbert Butler KBE and Arthur Francis Norman-Butler OBE.

In 1901 he married Ann Gertrude Smith, daughter of George Smith and sister of the Indian administrators Sir James Dunlop Smith and Charles Aitchison Smith and Sir George Adam Smith, Principal of the University of Aberdeen. They had two sons and two daughters:

- Richard Austen "Rab" Butler (1902–1982), the Conservative statesman
- Iris Mary Butler (1905–2002), a journalist and historian, the mother of Lady Williams of Elvel and the grandmother of Justin Welby, Archbishop of Canterbury.
- Dorothy Middleton (1909–1999), a writer and geographer
- John Perceval Butler (1914–1942), a Pilot Officer

== Works cited ==
- Howard, Anthony RAB: The Life of R. A. Butler, Jonathan Cape 1987 ISBN 978-0224018623
- Jago, Michael Rab Butler: The Best Prime Minister We Never Had?, Biteback Publishing 2015 ISBN 978-1849549202
- Matthew, Colin, ed. (2004). Dictionary of National Biography. Vol. 9. Oxford: Oxford University Press. ISBN 978-0198614111. (essay on Rab Butler)

Government offices
Preceded by Sir Claude Hill	Lieutenant Governor of the Isle of Man; 1933–1937	Succeeded by Earl Granville
Academic offices
Preceded by Arthur Hutchinson	Master of Pembroke College, Cambridge; 1937–1948	Succeeded by Sydney Castle Roberts
