= Justin Welby =

Archbishop of Canterbury from 2013 to 2025

The Right Reverend and Right Honourable Justin Welby GCVO PC
- Archbishop of Canterbury
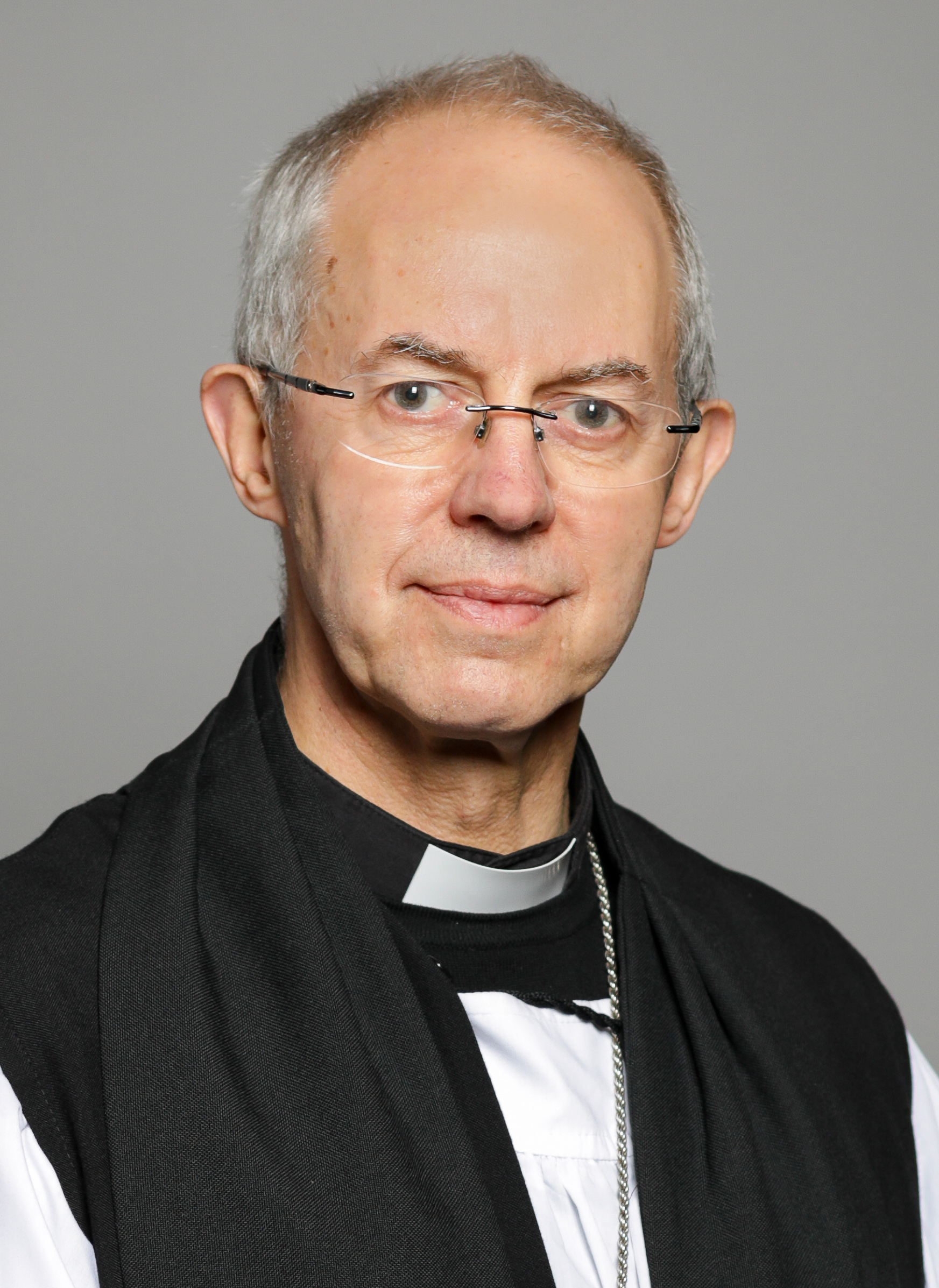
- Official portrait, 2019
- Church: Church of England
- Province: Canterbury
- Diocese: Canterbury
- Elected: 4 February 2013
- Installed: 21 March 2013
- Term ended: 6 January 2025
- Predecessor: Rowan Williams
- Successor: Sarah Mullally
- Previous posts: Bishop of Durham (2011–2013); Dean of Liverpool (2007–2011)

Orders
- Ordination: 28 June 1992 (Deacon); 27 June 1993 (Priest) by Simon Barrington-Ward
- Consecration: 28 October 2011 by John Sentamu

Personal details
- Born: Justin Portal Welby; 6 January 1956 (age 70) Hammersmith, London, England
- Denomination: Church of England
- Residence: Lambeth Palace, London; Old Palace
- Parents: Anthony Montague Browne (biological father); Jane Portal (mother)
- Spouse: Caroline Eaton
- Children: 6
- Education: Eton College; Trinity College, Cambridge (MA); St John's College, Durham (BA, DipMin)
- Signature: Justin Welby's signature
- Lord Spiritual
- Ex officio as Archbishop of Canterbury; 26 February 2013 – 6 January 2025
- Ex officio as Bishop of Durham; 12 January 2012 – 26 February 2013

Ordination history
History
Diaconal ordination
- Ordained by: Simon Barrington-Ward
- Place: Coventry Cathedral
Priestly ordination
- Ordained by: Simon Barrington-Ward
Episcopal consecration
- Consecrated by: John Sentamu
- Place: York Minster
- Justin Welby's voice On the BBC radio programme Today; Recorded 26 July 2013

Justin Portal Welby GCVO (born 6 January 1956) is a retired Anglican bishop who served as the 105th archbishop of Canterbury in the Church of England from 2013 to 2025.

After an 11-year career in the oil industry, Welby trained for ordination at St John's College, Durham. He served in a number of parish churches before becoming dean of Liverpool in 2007 and bishop of Durham in 2011, serving in the latter role for just over a year before succeeding Rowan Williams as Archbishop of Canterbury in February 2013.

As archbishop, Welby officiated at a number of notable events, including the wedding of Prince Harry and Meghan Markle, the state funeral of Elizabeth II, and the coronation of Charles III and Camilla. His tenure coincided with the ordination of the Church of England's first female bishop and the blessings for same-sex unions. Welby's theology is seen as representing the "open evangelical" tradition within Anglicanism. He has said that the Benedictine and Franciscan orders in the Anglican churches, along with Catholic social teaching, have influenced his spiritual formation.

Welby resigned as archbishop in January 2025, following the publication of the Makin Review into the Church of England's handling of abuse allegations against the barrister John Smyth. The review criticised Welby's failure to investigate the allegations.

== Family and early life ==
Justin Portal Welby was born on 6 January 1956 at Queen Charlotte's and Chelsea Hospital in Hammersmith, London, almost nine months after the marriage of his mother Jane Gillian Portal (1929–2023), to Gavin Bramhall James Welby (1910–1977).

=== Childhood and paternity ===
Welby's mother, Jane, was Sir Winston Churchill's personal secretary from December 1949 until her marriage to Gavin Welby in April 1955. Shortly before her marriage she had a brief relationship with Churchill's private secretary, Anthony Montague Browne (1923–2013). For 60 years Welby believed that Gavin Welby was his biological father until a paternity test in 2016 showed that he was Browne's son.

Gavin Welby (born Bernard Gavin Weiler in Ruislip, Middlesex) was the son of Bernard Weiler, a German-Jewish immigrant and importer of luxury items who changed the family name to Welby during the First World War. He stood for Parliament as a Conservative candidate in the 1951 and 1955 general elections.

Welby has described his early childhood as "messy". Gavin and Jane Welby, who were both alcoholics, divorced in 1959 when he was three years old, and he was placed in Gavin's custody. In 1960, Gavin became engaged to the actress Vanessa Redgrave. Vanessa's mother, Rachel Kempson, described him as "a real horror" and "a pretty rotten piece of work", and expressed relief when Vanessa called the engagement off. She was more complimentary about the young Justin, writing, "[Gavin's] child is angelic. We all loved him." Gavin died in 1977 of alcohol-related causes.

Jane stopped drinking in 1968, and in 1975 married Charles Williams, a business executive and first-class cricket player who was made a life peer in 1985. Williams was the nephew of Elizabeth Laura Gurney, a member of the Gurney family of Norwich who were prominent Quakers and social reformers, and was remembered by Welby as being a supportive step-father. Commenting on his mother's death in 2023, Welby said that it had been "a privilege to be her son".

=== Extended family ===
In 2024, Welby released a personal statement revealing that, through his biological father, Anthony Montague Browne, he was the great-great-great-grandson of Sir James Fergusson, 4th baronet (1765–1838), who owned slaves on his plantation in Jamaica and received compensation from the British Government in 1837 following the abolition of slavery. Through his biological father, Welby is also descended from Admiral Adam Duncan and Robert Stewart, the illegitimate son of King James V of Scotland.

Welby's maternal grandmother was the journalist and historian Iris Butler (1905–2002), whose brother (Welby's great-uncle) Rab was chancellor of the exchequer, home secretary, deputy prime minister and foreign secretary during the 1950s and 1960s, as well as master of Trinity College, Cambridge, where Welby later studied. Iris and Rab's father (Welby's maternal great-grandfather) was Sir Montagu Butler, governor of the Central Provinces of British India and master of Pembroke College, Cambridge. Sir Montagu was the grandson of George Butler, headmaster of Harrow School and dean of Peterborough, and the nephew of the educator George Butler (husband of the social reformer Josephine Butler) and of Henry Montagu Butler, headmaster of Harrow School, dean of Gloucester and master of Trinity College, Cambridge. Sir Montagu was also the grand-nephew of John Colenso, the first bishop of Natal.

Welby's maternal grandfather was Gervas Portal, a half-brother of Charles Portal, who served as Chief of the Air Staff during the Second World War. Gervas Portal's mother, Rose Leslie Portal (née Napier), was the granddaughter of General Sir William Napier and Caroline Amelia Fox. General Napier and his brothers Charles and George were the sons of Sir George Napier and Lady Sarah Lennox. Caroline Amelia Fox was the daughter of General Henry Edward Fox, younger brother of prominent Whig politician Charles James Fox, sons of the politician Henry Fox and Caroline Lennox. Caroline and Sarah Lennox were two of the five Lennox sisters, who were daughters of Charles Lennox, 2nd Duke of Richmond, and granddaughters of Charles II and his mistress Louise de Kérouaille, Duchess of Portsmouth.

== Education ==
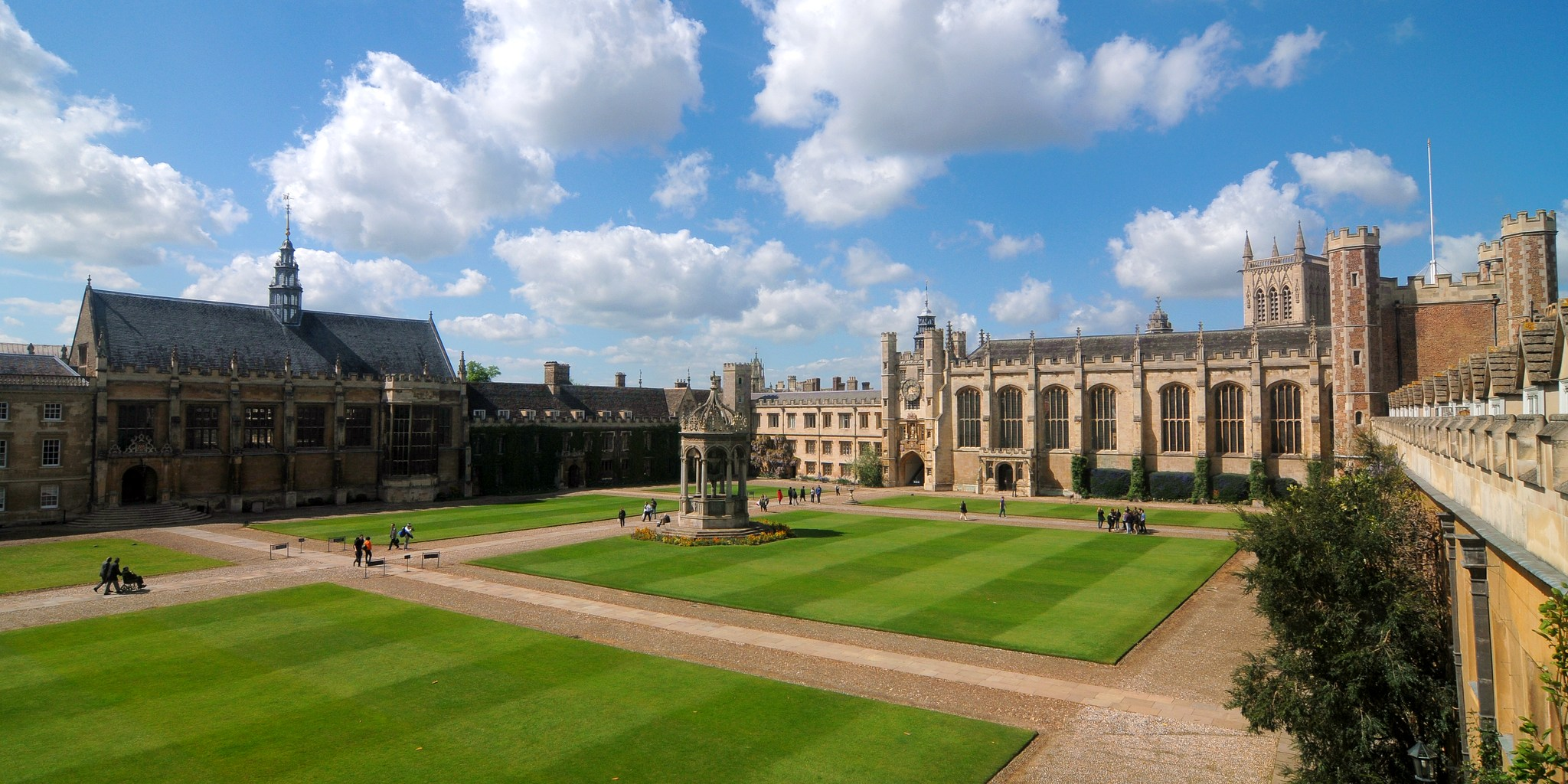
Trinity College, Cambridge

Welby was educated at St Peter's School, Seaford, between 1964 and 1968, and later at Eton College. He continued his studies at Trinity College, Cambridge, where his great-uncle, Rab Butler, was the master. Welby graduated in 1978 with a Bachelor of Arts degree in history and law and, according to custom, was later promoted to Master of Arts by seniority.

In a 2013 interview with The Daily Telegraph, Welby related his conversion experience when he was a student at Trinity College, Cambridge. He said that, while he was at Eton, he had "vaguely assumed there was a God. But I didn't believe. I wasn't interested at all." However, during the evening of 12 October 1975 in Cambridge, praying with a Christian friend, Welby said that he suddenly felt "a clear sense of something changing, the presence of something that had not been there before in my life". He said to his friend, "Please don't tell anyone about this." Welby said that he was desperately embarrassed that this had happened to him. In a 2014 interview, Welby said that his conversion had come when his friend had taken him to an "evangelistic address" which he found to be poor. After this, his friend "simply explained the Gospels" to him. Welby said that from that point onwards he "knew the presence of God". He has since said that his time at Cambridge was a major moment of self-realisation in his life.

He has said that at the age of 19, he began speaking in tongues.

== Career in the oil industry ==
Welby worked for eleven years in the oil industry, five of them for the French oil company Elf Aquitaine based in Paris. In 1984 he became treasurer of the oil exploration group Enterprise Oil plc in London, where he was mainly concerned with West African and North Sea oil projects, and spent part of his career in Nigeria. He retired from his executive position in 1989 and said that he sensed a calling from God to be ordained.

== Ordination and church ministry ==
Welby was at first rejected for ordination by John Hughes, the bishop of Kensington, who told him "There is no place for you in the Church of England".

He was subsequently accepted for ordination, with the support of the vicar of Holy Trinity Brompton, Sandy Millar. Throughout his ministry Welby has been linked to the charismatic evangelical wing of the Church of England associated with Holy Trinity Brompton, and in a 2019 interview said "In my own prayer life, and as part of my daily discipline, I pray in tongues every day".

From 1989 to 1992, Welby studied theology and trained for the priesthood at Cranmer Hall and St John's College, Durham, where he was awarded a Bachelor of Arts (BA) degree and a Diploma in Ministry (DipMin) in 1992. He was ordained a deacon at Petertide (on 28 June) 1992 and a priest the next Petertide (27 June 1993), both times by Simon Barrington-Ward, bishop of Coventry, at Coventry Cathedral. He then became a curate at Chilvers Coton and St Mary the Virgin, Astley (Nuneaton) from 1992 to 1995. He then became rector of St James' Church, Southam, and later vicar of St Michael and All Angels, Ufton, diocese of Coventry, from 1995 to 2002.

In 2002, Welby was appointed a canon residentiary of Coventry Cathedral and the co-director for international ministry at the International Centre for Reconciliation. In 2005, he was appointed sub-dean and canon for Reconciliation Ministry.

Welby was appointed dean of Liverpool in December 2007 and was installed at Liverpool Cathedral on 8 December 2007.

== Views on business ethics ==
Welby has written widely on ethics and on finance, featuring in books such as Managing the Church?: Order and Organisation in a Secular Age and Explorations in Financial Ethics. Welby's dissertation, an exploration into whether companies can sin, marks his point that the structure of a system can "make it easier to make the right choice or the wrong choice". His dissertation led to the publication of a booklet entitled Can Companies Sin?: "Whether", "How" and "Who" in Company Accountability, which was published by Grove Books in 1992.

After joining the House of Lords as a bishop, Welby was asked to join the Parliamentary Commission on Banking Standards in 2012. In July 2013, following the report of the Parliamentary Commission on Banking Standards, Welby explained that senior bank executives avoided being given information about difficult issues to allow them to "plead ignorance". He also said he would possibly have behaved in the same way, and warned against punishing by naming and shaming individual bankers which he compared to the behaviour of a lynch mob.

=== High-interest lending ===
In July 2013, Welby spoke out against payday lending sites and met with Errol Damelin, chief executive of Wonga. Welby pledged that the Church of England would support credit unions as society needs to "provide an alternative" to the "very, very costly forms of finance" that payday lending services represent. He noted that he did not want to make legal payday lending illegal, as this would leave people with no alternative to using criminal loan sharks.

Payday lenders lead to people being assured, through impressively slick marketing campaigns and targeted advertisements, that the process of taking out a loan is quick, simple and safe. However, once the loan has been taken out, it is difficult to get out of the cycle. With the rates offered, simply paying off the interest becomes a struggle.

Shortly after this well-publicised intervention in the public debate, it emerged that the Church of England's pension fund had invested money in Accel Partners, a venture capital firm that had invested in Wonga. This led to accusations of hypocrisy, and Welby said that the investment was "very embarrassing" for the church. Welby and the Church's Ethical Investment Advisory Group were unaware of their investment in Wonga.

Welby also said that the Ethical Investment Advisory Group ought to reconsider rules which allow investment in companies that make up to 25% of their income from gambling, alcohol or high-interest lending.

=== Bishop of Durham ===
Welby became bishop of Durham in 2011, although he was not to stay there long. Interviewed by the BBC, Welby said that the appointment was both challenging and a huge privilege.

Welby's election was confirmed at York Minster on 29 September 2011, and he left Liverpool Cathedral on 2 October. He was consecrated as a bishop at York Minster on 28 October 2011 by John Sentamu, archbishop of York; and was enthroned in Durham Cathedral on 26 November 2011. During his episcopate, Auckland Castle, a residence of the bishops of Durham from approximately 1183, was sold to the Auckland Project.

=== Beginning of parliamentary career ===
He was introduced to the House of Lords on 12 January 2012, where he sat on the Lords Spiritual bench. He gave his maiden speech on 16 May 2012.

== Archbishop of Canterbury ==
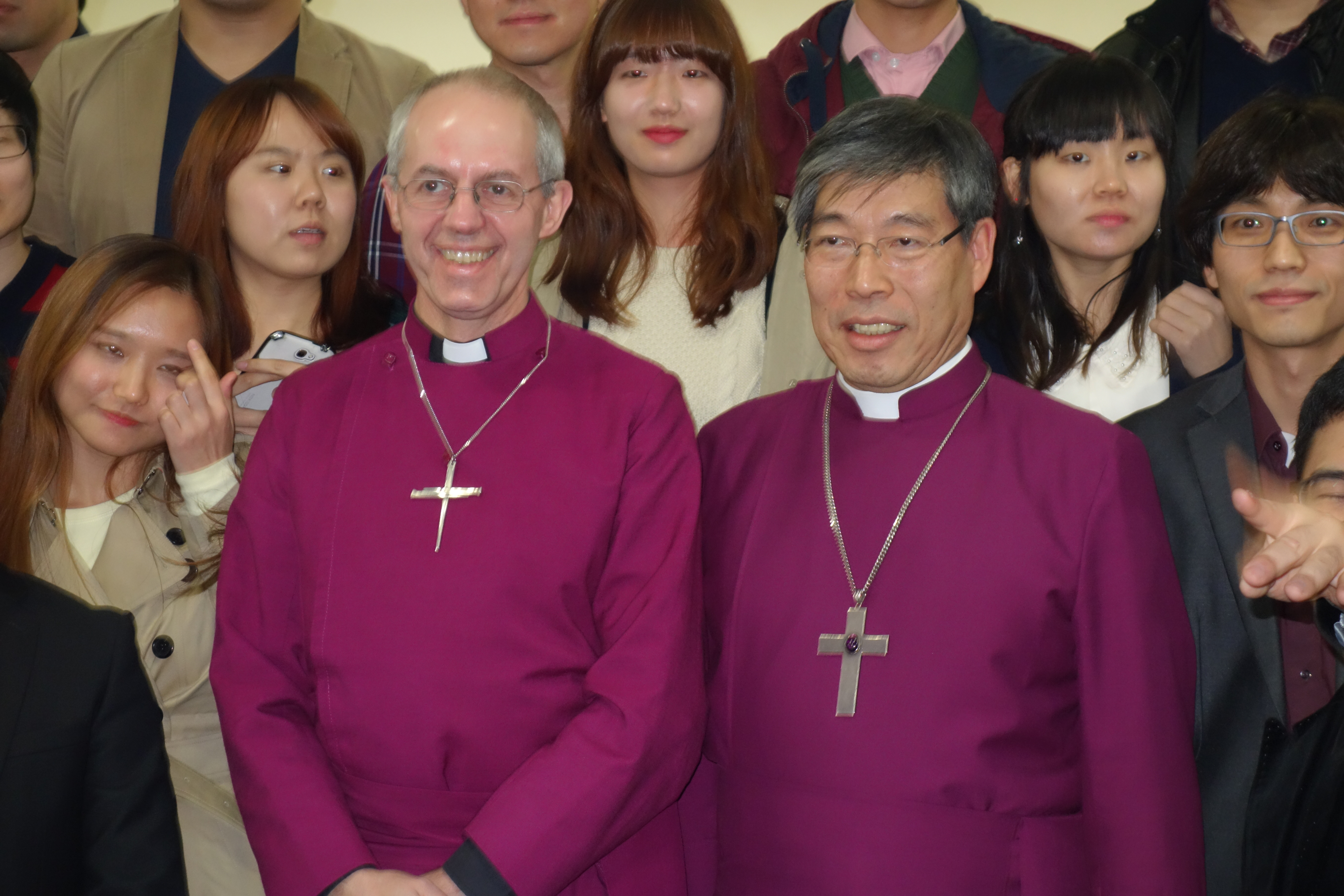
Welby and Paul Kim, Primate of the Province of Korea, at Seoul Cathedral in 2013

Welby emerged as a candidate for archbishop of Canterbury and his appointment was announced on 9 November 2012. In January 2013, Welby said that he initially thought it was "a joke" and "perfectly absurd" for him to be appointed to the role as he had only been a bishop for a short time. His confirmation of election ceremony to the see of Canterbury took place at St Paul's Cathedral on 4 February 2013 (by this, he legally became archbishop of Canterbury); on the following day it was announced that Welby would be appointed to the Privy Council of the United Kingdom, as is customary for archbishops; the order for his appointment was made on 12 February and he swore the oath on 13 March.

Welby was enthroned as archbishop at Canterbury Cathedral on 21 March 2013, the date in the Anglican church calendar that commemorates the life of Thomas Cranmer.

Welby's schedule included an official visit to the Vatican on 14 June 2013, with visits to senior curial officials, including Cardinal Kurt Koch, president of the Pontifical Council for Promoting Christian Unity, an official audience with Pope Francis and prayer at the tombs of Saint Peter and Pope John Paul II.

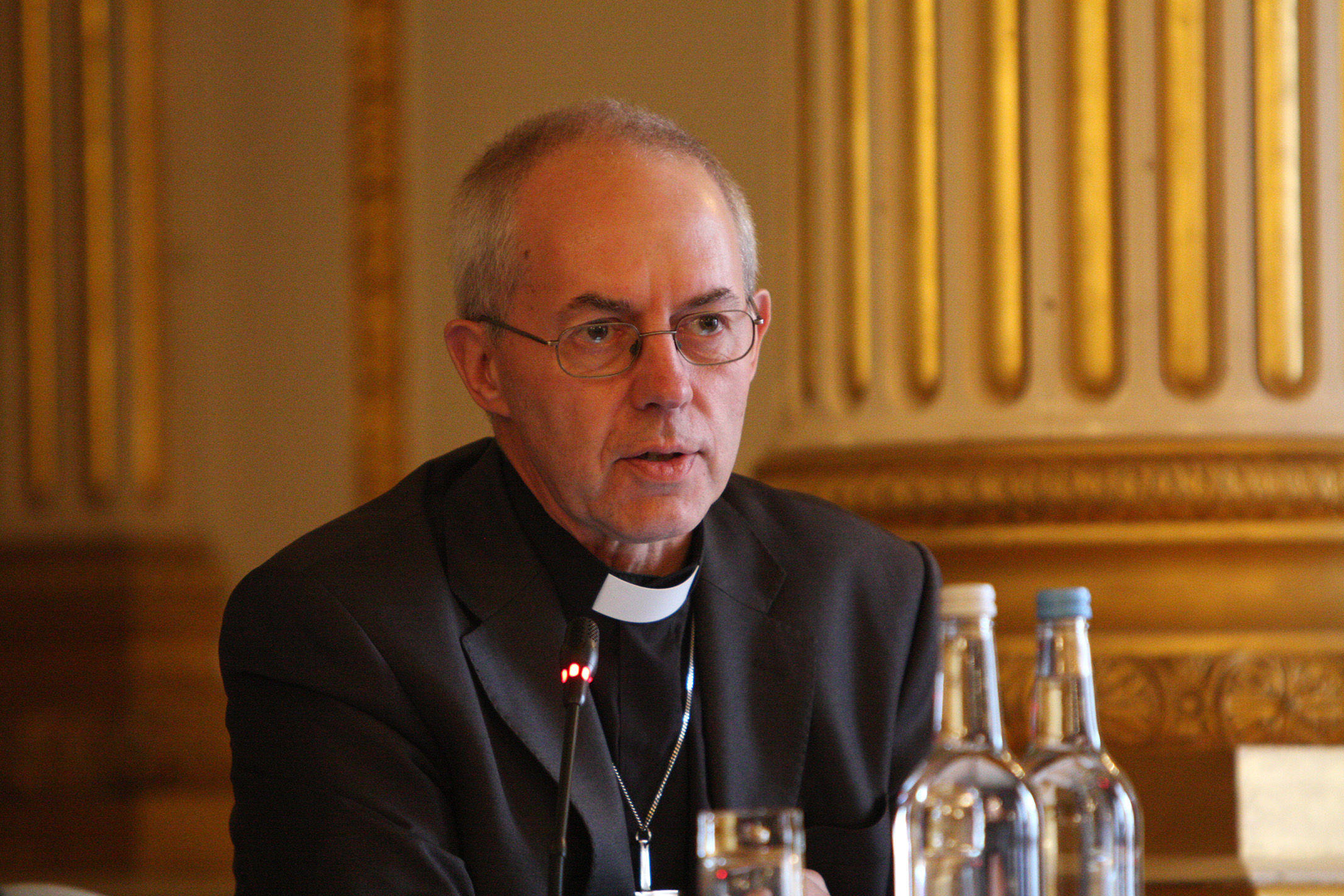
Welby in 2015

In a 12 July 2013 interview with The Daily Telegraph, Welby addressed questions about his religion. His answers included the following:

- Asked whether he can speak "in tongues", Welby answered, "Oh yes, it's just a routine part of spiritual discipline – you choose to speak and you speak a language that you don't know. It just comes."
- Asked whether it is necessary "for a true Christian to have had a personal conversion experience", Welby answered, "Absolutely not. There is an incredible range of ways in which the Spirit works. It doesn't matter how you get there. It really does quite matter where you are."
- Asked about "his strange and lonely youth", Welby said that "at the time, it felt horrible. Now it feels hugely valuable. God doesn't waste stuff." The interviewer asked Welby whether his family history had "wounded" him. After "a very long" pause, Welby answered, "I assume that I am, but I also assume that the grace of God is extraordinarily powerful in the healing of one's wounds."
- Asked whether he knows Jesus, Welby answered, "Yes. I do. He's both someone one knows and someone one scarcely knows at all, an utterly intimate friend and yet with indescribable majesty."
- Regarding his religious practices, Welby called himself "a spiritual magpie". The interviewer commented about Welby, "as well as speaking in tongues, he adores the sacrament of the Eucharist. He also says the morning and evening office, Book of Common Prayer version, in the chapel of the palace, every day. For Welby, 'the routine of regular prayer is immensely important in overcoming the ups and downs of human moods.' For his spiritual discipline, Welby uses Catholic models – the contemplation and stability of Benedictines and the rigorous self-examination of Ignatius of Loyola. He also has a spiritual director, the Roman Catholic priest Nicolas Buttet.
- The interviewer said that the church "is good at talking, but not at actually doing things to improve the social order." Welby retorted, "Rubbish! It is one of the most powerful forces of social cohesion. Did you know that each month all the Churches – roughly half of the numbers being Anglican – contribute 23 million hours of voluntary work, outside what they do in church? And it's growing. There are now between 1,200 and 2,000 food banks in which the Church is involved. Ten years ago, there were none. There are vicars living in every impoverished area in the country. This springs out of genuine spirituality."

In January 2019, Welby responded to Anglican priests defecting to the Roman Catholic Church by saying "Who cares?" and that he did not mind people leaving to join other denominations as long as they are "faithful disciples of Christ".

Welby's tenure as archbishop coincided with the ordination of Libby Lane as the church's first female bishop in 2014 and its approval of blessings for same-sex couples in 2023. He officiated at a number of notable events, such as the wedding of Prince Harry and Meghan Markle in 2018, the funeral of Elizabeth II in 2022 and the coronation of Charles III and Camilla in 2023.

=== Resignation ===
In November 2024, Welby faced calls to resign, including from members of the General Synod of the Church of England, following the Church's publication of an independent review (the Makin Review) into the Church's handling of allegations of physical and sexual abuse committed by the barrister John Smyth at Christian camps in the 1970s and 1980s. The report criticised Welby for failing to follow up on his subordinates' claims that they had passed on the matter to the police after he was informed of the allegations in 2013, and stated that it was "unlikely" Welby was not aware of concerns being reported about Smyth during the time of the alleged offences, as he had claimed.

Despite initially stating that he would not resign, on 12 November 2024, following mounting pressure from both victims and clerics, Welby announced that he had spoken to King Charles III, the Supreme Governor of the Church of England and would resign. Stressing the importance of taking "personal and institutional responsibility" for the "long-maintained conspiracy of silence about the heinous abuses" committed by Smyth and the "long felt and profound sense of shame at the historic safeguarding failures of the Church", he expressed hope that his resignation would make clear "how seriously the Church of England understands the need for change and our profound commitment to creating a safer church." On 20 November, Lambeth Palace announced that Welby would conclude his official duties by 6 January 2025, after which his official functions would be delegated to the archbishop of York, and that the end date of his term as archbishop would be set in consultation with the Privy Council.

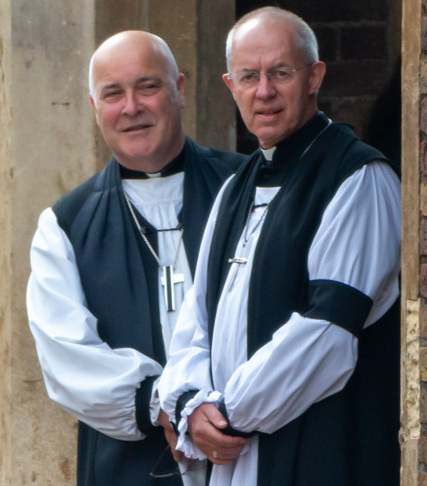
Welby with Stephen Cottrell, the archbishop of York, in 2022

In a statement, the Church of England's second-most senior bishop, Stephen Cottrell (archbishop of York), said that Welby's resignation was the "right and honourable thing to do". Echoing those remarks, other bishops thanked Welby for his "ministry, mission and leadership" while acknowledging the seriousness of the Church's safeguarding failings. The Prime Minister, Sir Keir Starmer, who had earlier publicly refused to support Welby, said that he "respects the decision".

Welby's resignation was followed by calls for other senior clergy involved in the Smyth cover-up to stand down. The bishop of Birkenhead, Julie Conalty, reiterated that Welby had "done the right thing", but stressed that his resignation alone was "not going to solve the problem" of safeguarding failures in the Church.

The UK Minister for Health and Social Care, Wes Streeting, speaking "as an Anglican, not as a Government minister", agreed that Welby should resign but church leaders should not think "one head rolling solves the problem". Streeting added that there are "deep and fundamental issues of not just practice, but [of the] culture on safeguarding, that need to be taken seriously".

Welby's final speech in the House of Lords on 5 December 2024 was criticised as he appeared to make light of the circumstances of his resignation. The bishop of Newcastle, Helen-Ann Hartley, said his tone was "unwise to say the least". Welby apologised the next day, and later said that he was "profoundly ashamed" of the speech.

Welby completed official duties on 6 January 2025 (his 69th birthday). Until the confirmation of election of Dame Sarah Mullally as his successor on 28 January 2026, the functions of the archbishop were delegated to Stephen Cottrell, archbishop of York, to Mullally, then-bishop of London, and to Rose Hudson-Wilkin, bishop of Dover. Welby's resignation became official at midnight on 7 January 2025, as declared by the King-in-Council on 18 December.

== Controversies ==
=== Iwerne camps and John Smyth ===
In February 2017, Welby apologised unreservedly after allegations that barrister and evangelical Christian John Smyth beat boys in the late 1970s, mainly pupils at Winchester College, until their wounds bled and left permanent scars. Smyth was a senior member of Christian charity the Iwerne Trust in the 1970s and 1980s. These allegations were suppressed by the church for decades, and Smyth was told to leave the UK.

Welby's early grounding in Christian doctrine was rooted in the Iwerne camp network founded by Eric Nash. Welby was a dormitory officer at the camps from around 1975 to 1978, a period that coincides with that of Smyth's child abuse at the same location. From 1978 to 1981, Smyth allegedly carried out a series of brutal beatings on boys and undergraduates, recorded in a report written by Iwerne officer Canon Mark Ruston in February 1982 but not passed on to the police until 2013.

In 2017, Welby described Smyth as "charming" and "delightful". Welby "vaguely recalls" receiving a Christmas card from Smyth in the 1990s, but definitively recalls meeting Smyth in Paris in the 1990s. In 1978, Welby left the UK to work in Paris and Welby stated that "I had no contact with them [the camps] at all." It later materialised that Welby had spoken at the camp in this period and had continued to receive the camp newsletter. Andrew Atherstone, in the biography Risk-taker and Reconciler, describes Welby as having been "involved in the camps as an undergraduate ... businessman and theological college student in the 1980s and early 1990s."

In 2012, a victim of Smyth reported the abuse to the Church of England and Welby was informed in 2013. Welby maintained that this was the first he heard of Smyth's abuses. The New York Times on 14 October 2017 quoted a senior Church of England figure as saying that "all senior members of the trust, including officers like Archbishop Welby, had been made aware of the allegations against Mr Smyth, even those who had been abroad". Questions have remained among Smyth's victims as to when Welby first knew, and some have labelled him an "observer", a term denoting a person who knew about abuse but who did not report appropriately. Welby said that he was not part of the inner circle of Smyth's friends and that survivors must come first, not the church's own interests.

An independent review in 2024 noted that Smyth's abuse was not merely physical and psychological, but sometimes sexual in nature, and concluded that the Church of England had covered up the allegations against Smyth for three decades. The report accused Welby of "minimisation" of Smyth's actions and found that he failed to inform church authorities in Cape Town of the risk of abuse. Specifically, the report found that Welby had been informed of Smyth's abuse in August 2013, six months after his elevation to archbishop of Canterbury, but did not personally ensure that the reports were passed on to the police. Although Welby stated (and the report agreed) that his subordinates told him the authorities had been alerted, the report found that the Church failed to use full efforts to ensure that Smyth was investigated and prosecuted. The report found that the Church informally disclosed the matter to Cambridgeshire Police and the Metropolitan Police, but the former did not record the allegations as a crime and the latter passed the matter to Hampshire Police, which initially declined to pursue the matter until a Channel 4 news report. Despite Hampshire Police's belated investigation, Smyth was not prosecuted before his death in 2018.

Welby initially stated that he would not resign after the release of the report. In response, over 1,500 church members called on Welby to step down from his position, and on 12 November 2024 he announced his decision to resign as archbishop of Canterbury.

=== Support for Paula Vennells ===
Welby was criticised for continuing to support Paula Vennells, head of the British Post Office, long after it emerged that the company was prosecuting sub-postmasters for errors caused by the Post Office's Horizon IT system. Canon Jeremy Haselock, a former chaplain to Queen Elizabeth, publicly called for Welby's resignation after it was claimed he pushed Vennells' application to become the bishop of London, the Church's third most senior role.

In the preface to his 2018 book, Reimagining Britain, published after 555 postmasters had launched legal action against the Post Office, Welby said she "shaped my thinking over the years". And in February 2019 she was appointed to the Church's Ethical Investment Advisory Group, after more than 900 sub-postmasters had been prosecuted because of faulty software. In 2024, Welby said "more questions should have been asked" after the Horizon scandal emerged, and "we will need to reflect on it".

=== Global South Fellowship of Anglican Churches dispute ===
On 20 February 2023, several bishops of the Global South Fellowship of Anglican Churches released a statement declaring that they no longer recognised Welby as head of the Anglican Communion due to the Church of England's decision to bless same-sex marriages.

=== The Late Bishop George Bell ===
Although Welby had no official involvement in this case, which concerned a single posthumous complaint of child sexual abuse by the late Bishop George Bell of Chichester allegedly 60 years earlier, he made several public statements about it that added to the furore it had raised and further weakened the Church's case against Bell. Although this had already been shown by Lord Carlile in 2017 to be totally groundless, Welby announced early in 2018 that a 'significant cloud' remained over the late Bishop's name, solely on the basis that an allegation had been made against him and regardless of the fact that the independently commissioned Carlile Report had cleared his name. The Church then proceeded to publicise supposedly fresh allegations of abuse that had not been brought to light during Lord Carlile's review of 2016-2017. The Diocese of Chichester subsequently commissioned another review, carried out by Timothy Briden KC and published in July 2018. Like Lord Carlile before him, Briden found that 'the case against [Bell]'... was not credible following investigation'. However, Welby did not retract his 'significant cloud' remark until late in 2021. He wrote that while he had been wrong to have delayed his retraction, 'we also have a duty of care to those who are accused'. This was a notable modification of his previous stand. It fell far short of the unequivocal apology which supporters of Bell were seeking. Nevertheless, Welby did then go on to state that he hoped the planned statue of Bell, previously commissioned by Canterbury Cathedral, would now go ahead.

== Views ==
=== Brexit and austerity ===
In February 2018, Welby expressed fears that Brexit was dividing UK society and the United Kingdom government austerity programme was harming vulnerable people. Welby wrote:

Brexit has divided the country and now we need a new narrative. One that is rooted in all that is best in our history – solidarity, courage, aspiration, resilience and care for each other. There is a danger that there is a schism in our society into which the most vulnerable are falling. Austerity is crushing the weak, the sick and many others.

In August 2019, Welby called for EU Remainers to "stop whingeing" and accept the result of the 2016 Brexit referendum.

=== COVID-19 ===
In January 2021, Welby received his first COVID-19 vaccine, writing on Twitter: "The rapid development of the vaccine is an answer to prayer – and it is central to the recovery from this terrible pandemic". He has spoken out against "malicious rumour-mongering" relating to the pandemic.

Welby also said he was concerned that the COVID-19 pandemic in the United Kingdom exacerbated existing inequalities. He spoke with bereaved families and added tributes to the National Covid Memorial Wall (representing those who died of COVID-19). In April 2021, Welby called for the start of a COVID-19 public inquiry.

=== Environmental sustainability ===
In 2021, Welby, Pope Francis, and Bartholomew I, current Ecumenical Patriarch of Constantinople, made a joint declaration to address together the urgency of environmental sustainability.

=== Food banks ===
In 2013, Welby disagreed strongly with Lord (David) Freud, the Parliamentary Under Secretary of State for Welfare Reform at the time, because Welby believed the UK government cuts to benefits had caused or contributed to the surge in food banks. Welby cited a Church of England investigation showing social services referred 35% of Durham residents who used food banks when benefits they were entitled to had not been paid. Welby stated:

Maybe he [Lord Freud] has different figures but those were certainly the figures we kept in the churches… We are very strict about our statistics and we don't just hand out food – you have to be referred.

Before Christmas 2013, Welby urged people to give 10% of their spending to food banks at Christmas.

In December 2014, Welby expressed concern about the increasing need for food banks, which he said would have been "unthinkable" a decade before. He called the plight of hungry poor people shocking because he did not expect that in the UK, saying that it was "a very sad fact that they're there, but also it's a great opportunity for the Church to demonstrate the love of Christ."

=== Fuel suppliers ===
In 2013, Welby expressed concern about rises in energy prices in the UK, saying that energy companies had a responsibility towards customers and should take this into account rather than only maximising their own opportunities.

The impact on people, particularly on low incomes, is going to be really severe in this [rising energy prices], and the companies have to justify fully what they are doing. (...) They have control because they sell something everyone has to buy. We have no choice about buying it with that amount of power comes huge responsibility to serve society.

=== General election ===
In the run-up to the 2017 United Kingdom general election, Justin Welby and archbishop of York John Sentamu campaigned on the need to address poverty, education, housing and health. The archbishops stressed the importance of "education for all, of urgent and serious solutions to our housing challenges, the importance of creating communities as well as buildings, and a confident and flourishing health service that gives support to all – especially the vulnerable – not least at the beginning and end of life."

=== Inequality ===
Welby has expressed concern about inequality in the UK. In September 2017, he said, "Our economic model is broken. Britain stands at a watershed moment where we need to make fundamental choices about the sort of economy we need. We are failing those who will grow up into a world where the gap between the richest and poorest parts of the country is significant and destabilising." He has praised the welfare state as a Christian endeavour emanating from the likes of R. H. Tawney, William Temple and William Beveridge. He also said in 2021 that the COVID-19 pandemic in the United Kingdom had exacerbated existing inequalities, and called for the building of "a new Beveridge".

Welby's growing political influence led to him being named by the New Statesman as the UK's twenty-seventh most powerful left-wing figure, citing his campaigning for refugee rights, condemnation of austerity, and advocacy against the gig economy.

=== Islam ===
In July 2014, Welby acknowledged that there was a problem with Muslim youths travelling to the Syrian Civil War and elsewhere to wage jihad but the numbers were "extraordinarily small", and so he dismissed concerns over the potential for trouble as "hysterical... I think we're in danger of slipping into a very fearful culture". In 2015, he offered his support for British air strikes against the Islamic State of Iraq and the Levant (ISIS) in Syria. Welby believes that the problem of Islamic extremism is far deeper than combating Islamic jihadists such as ISIS and Al-Qaeda; and that the Gulf monarchies and Saudi Arabia need to be challenged as their "own promotion of a particular brand of Islamic theology has provided a source from which ISIL have drawn a false legitimization."

In an interview with The Daily Telegraph in November 2016, Welby stated that claiming that the actions of ISIS are "nothing to do with Islam" was damaging efforts to combat extremism. Welby stipulated that it was essential to understand the religious motivation behind extremism to understand it and, similarly, also criticised the argument that claims that "Christian militia in the Central African Republic are nothing to do with Christianity."

=== Judaism ===
In July 2023, Welby attended an interfaith event hosted by the Board of Deputies of British Jews at Bevis Marks Synagogue in London. Welby wore a kippah (Jewish skullcap) as a mark of respect at the synagogue. While there, Welby met with historian Simon Sebag Montefiore and engaged in a conversation with him as part of the interfaith event. Welby stated that, with regard to Judaism, "There is no question that a country with a large Jewish community will be a better country. It will flourish in almost any area you care to name". Welby referred to antisemitism in Nazi Germany and noted while reading about the German churches' responses to the Nazis that "You saw there that the moment you don't push back against antisemitism, it becomes so engrained [sic] – and antisemitic laws or anti-semitic attitudes become permissible, and everything becomes permissible. It's a cancer of extraordinarily rapid growth, which you can't deal with if you leave it for any time".

=== Modern slavery ===
Welby condemns modern slavery as a crime against humanity. He joined with Pope Francis and leaders of other faiths, Buddhist, Hindu, Jewish and Muslim, in a joint declaration they would work together aiming to end modern slavery by 2020. Forced labour and prostitution, human trafficking and organ trade were specifically mentioned but all relationships that do not respect human equality, freedom and dignity were condemned.

=== Palestine and the International Court of Justice advisory opinion ===
On 2 August 2024, Welby issued a statement in support for the International Court of Justice's advisory opinion of 19 July 2024 by declaring "Israel's presence in the Occupied Palestinian Territories is unlawful and needs to end as rapidly as possible". The announcement came after what is understood to be a two-week period of reflection.

=== Persecution of Christians ===
Welby is concerned that Christians are persecuted in some parts of the world, notably in the Middle East, and fears that some risk their lives going to church. Welby also said that Christians and other religious minorities were made to suffer terribly and were killed in Iraq, which violates article 18 of the Universal Declaration of Human Rights. Welby noted that Christians and other minorities face persecution for their faith in many areas worldwide; he cited Syria, South Sudan, and the Central African Republic among others. Welby urged the United Kingdom to open its doors to refugees.

=== Poverty ===
Referring to poverty in the UK in March 2013, Welby criticised UK government changes which capped benefits below inflation.

As a civilised society, we have a duty to support those among us who are vulnerable and in need. When times are hard, that duty should be felt more than ever, not disappear or diminish. It is essential that we have a welfare system that responds to need and recognises the rising costs of food, fuel and housing. The current benefits system does that, by ensuring that the support struggling families receive rises with inflation. These changes will mean it is children and families who will pay the price for high inflation, rather than the government.

In a speech at Christmas 2013, Welby said, "Even in a recovering economy, Christians, the servants of a vulnerable and poor saviour, need to act to serve and love the poor; they need also to challenge the causes of poverty." In a speech at Easter 2013, Welby said, "In this country, even as the economy improves, there is weeping in broken families, in people ashamed to seek help from food banks, or frightened by debt. Asylum seekers weep with loneliness and missing [sic] far away families."

Referring to poverty in the UK and generally, in 2017 and again in 2021, Welby said that "we should all share concern for the poor and the marginalised, should work to build communities where people act responsibly towards one another, whether we are rich or poor we all have the same dignity. William Beveridge, R. H. Tawney and William Temple played a significant part in establishing the post-war welfare state in the United Kingdom and were committed Christians. We do not have the luxury of saying, 'Something must be done' without doing anything ourselves."

Welby has said that justice of the powerful is not justice at all and judges should decide issues based on truth and the common good rather than class and money. Welby quoted Nelson Mandela that "dealing with poverty was a matter of justice rather than charity." Welby felt that speaking out about poverty, fuel bills, financial insecurity affecting families and credit unions is part of the Christian duty to love one's neighbour.

Welby has said that insecurity of income is also a problem for many people. He expressed concern that many people cannot save or plan for, for example a holiday because they do not know how much money will be coming in from week to week. In September 2018, Welby said:

You don't know from one week to the next what you'll be earning. And so for people trying to budget, people trying to just save a bit so that, I don't know, once a month they could have fish and chips with their kids or go to the cinema or go down to the beach on a nice hot summer, they can't plan. It comes back to justice and the common good.

Welby also said in 2018:

Certainly there are parts of the country where there's huge deprivation. We see communities caught in a poverty trap. Now, the economy has improved very much in many places but there's a significant group of people who just seem trapped and the system doesn't help them.

=== Refugees ===
Welby disagrees with restrictions on child refugees being admitted to the UK. In 2017, he expressed fears that children were vulnerable to exploitation and even death.

Our country has a great history of welcoming those in need, particularly the most vulnerable, such as unaccompanied children. Refugees, like all people, are treasured human beings made in the image of God who deserve safety, freedom and the opportunity to flourish. We must resist and turn back the worrying trends we are seeing around the world, towards seeing the movement of desperate people as more of a threat to identity and security than an opportunity to do our duty. We cannot withdraw from our long and proud history of helping the most vulnerable.

=== Sexuality and same-sex marriage ===
In March 2013, Welby stated that "My understanding of sexual ethics has been that, regardless of whether it's gay or straight, sex outside marriage is wrong." He reiterated this belief again later in 2013, further noting that "To abandon the ideal simply because it's difficult to achieve is ridiculous."

Welby does not unequivocally affirm the Church of England's historic opposition to same-sex marriage. At his first press conference he spoke out strongly against homophobia and stated that he is "always averse to the language of exclusion, when what we are called to is to love in the same way as Jesus Christ loves us." He also said "I know I need to listen very attentively to the LGBT communities, and examine my own thinking prayerfully and carefully." Before his enthronement, he stated that he did not have doubts about the church's policy in opposing same-sex marriages but remained "challenged as to how we respond to it". "You see gay relationships that are just stunning in the quality of the relationship", he said, adding that he had "particular friends where I recognise that and am deeply challenged by it".

Welby sees problems with special services of blessing for same-sex couples, saying in 2014: "There is great fear among some, here and round the world, that that will lead to the betrayal of our traditions, to the denial of the authority of scripture, to apostasy, not to use too strong a word and there is also a great fear that our decisions will lead us to the rejection of LGBT people, to irrelevance in a changing society, to behaviour that many see akin to racism. Both those fears are alive and well in this room today [a General Synod meeting in London]. We have to find a way forward that is one of holiness and obedience to the call of God and enables us to fulfil our purposes. This cannot be done through fear. How we go forward matters deeply, as does where we arrive". In 2016, Welby confirmed he had appointed a bishop, Nicholas Chamberlain, (the bishop of Grantham) who is in a same-sex relationship, and that he supports clergy who are in celibate same-sex relationships in line with the church's policy.

Welby has since said that he has become "much less certain" about his stance on human sexuality. In an interview with Alastair Campbell in October 2017, he was asked if same-sex activity was sinful and declined to give a clear answer, saying: "I don't do blanket condemnation of people." When asked if a stable relationship could be between two people of the same sex, Welby said "I know it could be", and accepted that faithfulness and love were the "absolutely central" aspects of relationships, but added:

I am also aware, and deeply held by, the fact that since long before Christianity, within the Jewish tradition, marriage is understood as invariably as between a man and a woman, or at various times, a man and several women … I'm having to struggle to be faithful to the tradition, faithful to scripture, to understand what the call and will of God is in the twenty-first century, and to respond appropriately with love for all people, and not condemning them, whether I agree with them or not.

He also stated that while homophobia was a sin, he did not consider it homophobic to oppose gay sex. In 2023, Welby announced that he supports a proposal by the House of Bishops that maintains that marriage is between one man and a woman but which would also authorise "prayers of thanksgiving, dedication and for God's blessing for same-sex couples". Speaking of his support for the proposal, Welby said he was "extremely, joyfully celebratory of these new resources" while he also clarified that he will not perform the blessings because of his role as an "instrument of unity" for the Anglican Communion. In November 2023, Welby endorsed an additional proposal to authorise "standalone" blessings for same-sex couples on a trial basis. He is the first sitting archbishop of Canterbury to support a proposal to allow blessings for same-sex unions in the Church of England. On 15 November 2023, Welby abstained in the General Synod vote to introduce "standalone services for same-sex couples" on a trial basis saying that his abstention was due to his role as a symbol of unity in the whole Anglican Communion; the motion passed. In October 2024, Welby announced that his views on sex had evolved, sharing that his personal view is that sexual intimacy, whether for opposite-sex or same-sex couples, should take place "within a committed relationship", including marriage and civil partnership. Lambeth Palace reiterated that Welby was expressing his personal view, not necessarily the doctrine of the Church of England.

=== Social injustice ===
Welby said in 2018 that social injustice was widespread and entrenched in British society. He said the gig economy was one of many injustices. Welby said in September 2018 that the weakest people got the least secure pensions and the strongest got the most secure pensions, stating:

In these areas, and in employment rights, and in many others, we see that where inequality and profound injustice seem entrenched, insurmountable, it leads to instability in our society: divisions between peoples and vulnerability to the populism that stirs hatred between different ethnicities and religious groups, the rise of ancient demons of racism, antisemitism, Islamophobia and xenophobia.

=== Taxation ===
Welby said in December 2017 that tax avoidance was wrong and that many wealthy companies did not pay as much tax as they should. Welby said, "It is clear that a company that has a turnover of several billion and yet pays only a few million in tax, something isn't quite working there. It is to do with transfer pricing, there are all kinds of explanations, but people who earn money from a society should pay tax in that society for the common good, for economic justice."

In September 2018, Welby said:

What is clear is that tax should be a fundamental part of being a citizen, and that those who have the most should pay the most. And that no company, through being multinational, being global, can evade the responsibilities of paying its proper amount of tax, based on the revenues it earns in this country. So yes, some people will need to pay more. I'm not going to point at individuals, but certainly we see people and companies that seem not to pay what sounds like a reasonable amount of tax.

Welby also said in 2018:

Not paying taxes speaks of the absence of commitment to our shared humanity, to solidarity and justice. If you earn money from a community, you should pay your share of tax to that community. I was in business, and I know that, within limits, it's right and proper for people to arrange their tax affairs, and for companies to do so. But when vast companies like Amazon, and other online traders – the new industries – can get away with paying almost nothing in tax, there is something wrong with the tax system. They don't pay a real living wage, so the taxpayer must support their workers with benefits, and having leached off the taxpayer once, they don't pay for our defence, for security, for stability, for justice, for health, for equality, for education. Then they complain of an undertrained workforce, from the education they have not paid for, and pay almost nothing for apprenticeships. Those are only a fraction of the costs of aggressive tax management.

In October 2022, Welby criticised the UK government for introducing tax cuts for the wealthy and for pursuing policies that disproportiontely affected the poor.

=== Universal credit ===
Welby has expressed concern that Universal Credit is harming poor people and said in September 2018 that its rollout should be stopped. Welby said:

It [Universal Credit] was supposed to make it simpler and more efficient. It has not done that. It has left too many people worse off, putting them at risk of hunger, debt, rent arrears and food banks. When universal credit comes into a local area, the number of people going to food banks goes up. What is clear is if they cannot get it right, they need to stop rolling it out.

=== Women bishops ===
Welby has been a strong supporter of Anglican consecration of women as bishops. In November 2013, Welby stated he aimed to ordain women as bishops while allowing space for those who disagree. In February 2014, Welby called on Anglicans to avoid fear, prejudice and suspicion and to grasp "cultural change in the life of the church":

We have agreed that we will ordain women as Bishops. At the same time we have agreed that while doing that we want all parts of the church to flourish. If we are to challenge fear we have to find a cultural change in the life of the church, in the way our groups and parties work, sufficient to build love and trust. That will mean different ways of working at every level of the church in practice in the way our meetings are structured, presented and lived out and in every form of appointment. It will, dare I say, mean a lot of careful training and development in our working methods, because the challenge for all institutions today, and us above all, is not merely the making of policy but how we then make things happen.

Welby would like discipline applied over appointments to prevent opponents of women as bishops feeling alienated. Welby says he hopes to avoid a zero-sum game where people feel gain for one side inevitably means loss for the other, he sees need for caution, co-operation and unity. Slightly revised legislation to allow women to be ordained bishops in the Church of England was agreed in July 2014 and became law in November 2014.

== Personal life ==
Welby is married to Caroline Eaton and they have had six children. In 1983, their seven-month-old daughter, Johanna, died in a car crash in France. Referring to the tragedy, Welby explained, "It was a very dark time for my wife Caroline and myself, but in a strange way it actually brought us closer to God." Welby established a special day for bereaved parents at Coventry Cathedral, where there is now an annual service commemorating the lives of children who have died.

His daughter Katharine has written of her experience of poor mental health. Another daughter, Ellie, has learning disabilities.

Welby acknowledges his privileged education and upbringing, and has been praised for sending his own children to local state schools.

Welby speaks French and is an avid Francophile, having lived and worked in France. An announcement about his appointment as Bishop of Durham listed his hobbies as "most things French and sailing".

== Books ==
Welby is the author or co-author of several books, including:

- Dethroning Mammon: Making Money Serve Grace (Bloomsbury Continuum, 2017) ISBN 9781472929778
- In This Light: Thoughts for Christmas (2018) ISBN 9780310100300
- Reimagining Britain: Foundations for Hope (Bloomsbury Continuum, 2018) ISBN 9781472984975
- The Power of Reconciliation (Bloomsbury Continuum, 2021) ISBN 9781399402972
- Now You are God's People (SCM Press, 2024) ISBN 9780334065647
- Wild Bright Hope: Reflections on Faith (SPCK Lent Book, 2025) ISBN 9780281091003

== Honours ==
Welby was appointed Knight Grand Cross of the Royal Victorian Order (GCVO) in the 2024 New Year Honours for services at the Coronation of Charles III and Camilla.

Church of England titles
Preceded by Rupert Hoare	Dean of Liverpool; 2007–2011	Succeeded by Pete Wilcox
Preceded by N. T. Wright	Bishop of Durham; 2011–2013	Succeeded by Paul Butler
Preceded by Rowan Williams	Archbishop of Canterbury; 2013–2025	Succeeded by Sarah Mullally
