= Dorothy Middleton =

British geographer and writer

- Born: Dorothy Butler; 19 November 1909; Lahore, Punjab
- Died: 3 February 1999 (aged 89); London
- Occupations: Writer, geographer
- Spouse: Laurence Middleton
- Parents: Montagu Butler (father); Anne Smith (mother)

Dorothy Middleton (9 November 1909 – 3 February 1999) was a writer and geographer who held several roles at the Royal Geographical Society. Her best-known work is Victorian Lady Travellers (1965).

== Biography ==
Dorothy Butler was born on 9 November 1909 to Sir Montagu Sherard Dawes Butler and Anne Gertrude Smith, in Lahore, British India, where her father was Deputy Commissioner. The family later relocated to Cambridge, when her retired father became a master at Pembroke College. On 30 April 1938, she married Laurence Henry Neave Middleton, a lawyer, and the Middletons settled in Chelsea, London.

In the 1950s, Middleton was introduced by John Murray to some letters written by Isabella Bird. From this, Middleton's interest in women travellers grew, resulting in the book Victorian Lady Travellers (1965) along with contributions to the Dictionary of National Biography and lectures around Britain. She published Lugard in Africa jointly with A. A. Thomson (1959), and edited a reprint of The Art of Travel by Francis Galton (1971).

Middleton held a number of roles at the Royal Geographical Society, at a time when this was still a male preserve. She was assistant editor of The Geographical Journal for twenty years, became an Honorary Fellow in 1971 and an Honorary Vice-President in 1987.

Dorothy Middleton died on 3 February 1999 in Chelsea.

== Works ==
- Bonnie Prince Charlie (1948). co-authored with Clemence Dane, London: Convoy Publications. - Charles Edward Stuart
- Middleton, Dorothy (1949). Baker of the Nile. London: The Falcon Press. - Samuel Baker
- Thomson, A. A.; Middleton, Dorothy (1959). Lugard in Africa. Hale. - Frederick Lugard
- Middleton, Dorothy (1965). Victorian Lady Travellers. Routledge & K.Paul. - Isabella Bird, Marianne North, Fanny Workman, May French Sheldon, Annie Taylor, Kate Marsden and Mary Kingsley
- The Diary of A. J. Mounteney Jephson (1969). editor, Cambridge University Press. - Arthur Jephson
- Galton, Francis (1971). Middleton, Dorothy (ed.). The Art of Travel. David & Charles.
