= Iris Butler =

English journalist and historian (1905–2002)

Iris Mary Butler (15 June 1905 – 9 November 2002) was an English journalist and historian.

Butler was born in Simla, India, to Sir Montagu Sherard Dawes Butler and his wife Ann. Her brother was the Conservative politician Rab Butler. She wrote for the Eastern Daily Press and in 1967 published an account of the tempestuous relationship between Queen Anne, Sarah, Duchess of Marlborough and Abigail Masham. In 1927, she married Gervas Portal, a half-brother of Lord Portal of Hungerford, but published works under her maiden name.

Iris Butler's daughter is Jane Williams, Baroness Williams of Elvel. Her grandson is Justin Welby, who was appointed the Archbishop of Canterbury in 2013.

== Works ==
- Rule of Three (1967).
- The Viceroy's Wife: Letters of Alice, Countess of Reading, from India 1921-1925 (1969).
- The Eldest Brother: the Marquess Wellesley 1760-1842 (1973).
