= James Dunlop Smith =

British official in the Indian army

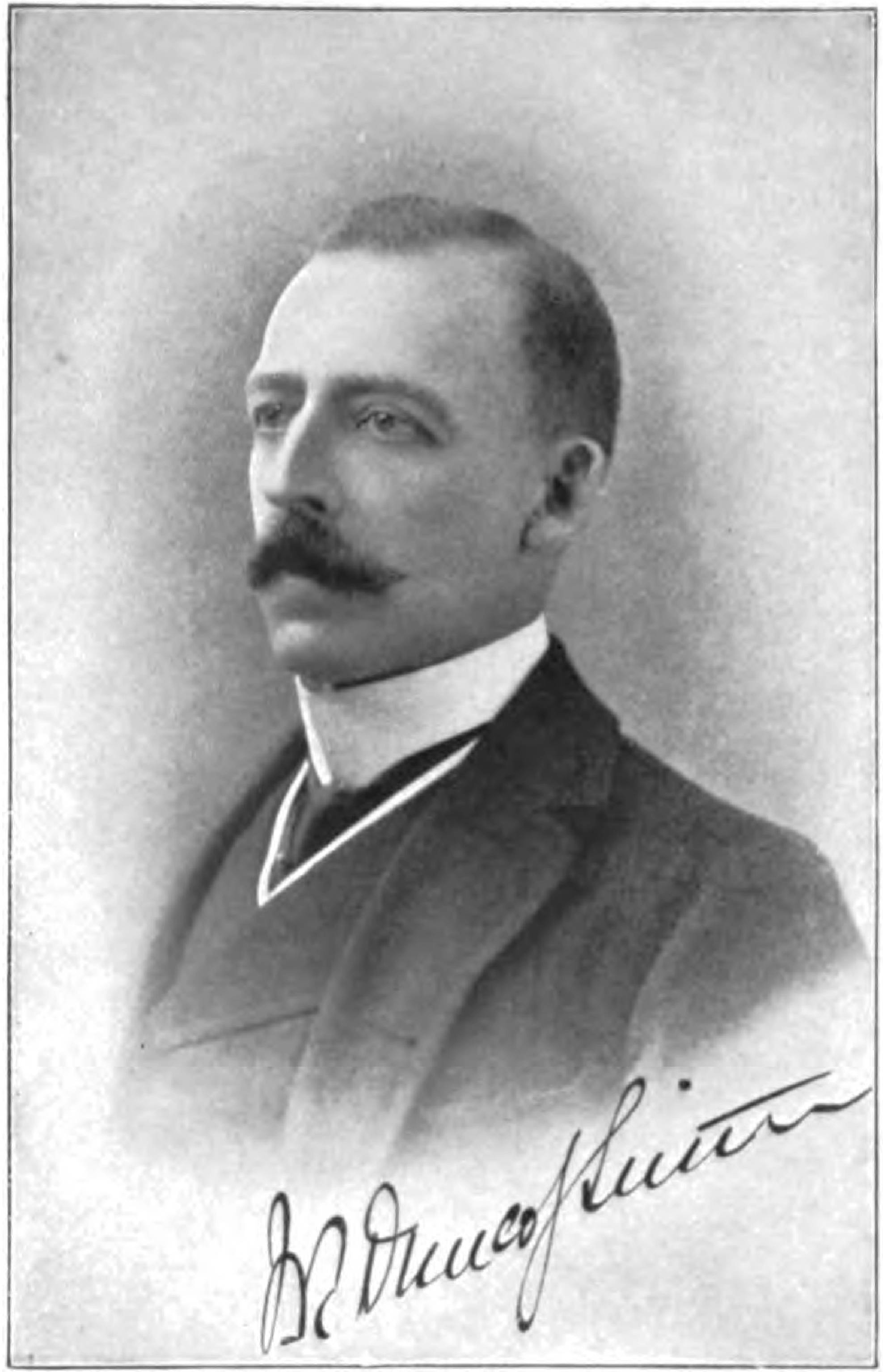
James Dunlop Smith

Lieutenant Colonel Sir James Robert Dunlop Smith KCSI KCVO CIE (24 August 1858 – 24 April 1921) was a British official in the Indian Army.

== Life of Smith ==
He was born in Calcutta on 24 August 1858, son of George Smith (1833–1919), Principal of Doveton Boy's College. His siblings included Charles Aitchison Smith, George Adam Smith and the mother of Rab Butler. He was educated at Edinburgh University and the Royal Military College, Sandhurst.

Commissioned a Second Lieutenant in the 22nd Regiment 1879, Smith became a Lieutenant in the Indian Staff Corps in 1882. He was appointed Private Secretary to the Lieut-Governor of the Punjab, 1883, and Settlement Officer, Sialkot in 1887. He was then appointed Deputy Commissioner, Hissar, 1896; Director of Land Records and Agriculture, Punjab 1897; Famine Commissioner, Rajputana, 1899; member of Horse and Mule-Breeding Commission, India 1900; and Political Agent, Phulkian States and Bhawalpur, 1901.

Smith rose to become the Private Secretary to the Viceroy, Lord Minto, from 1905 to 1910. He died 24 April 1921.

== Family ==
Smith married Beatrice Clementia, eldest daughter of Sir Charles Umpherston Aitchison, in 1887. They had two daughters; she died in 1902.
