= Charles Aitchison Smith =

British Army and Indian Army officer and administrator

Lieutenant-Colonel Charles Aitchison Smith CIE (12 September 1871 – 26 January 1940) was a British Army and Indian Army officer and administrator in India.

Smith was born in Leith, the son of George Smith, a well-known writer on India. His brothers were Sir George Adam Smith and Sir James Dunlop Smith. His sister was the mother of the politician Rab Butler. Smith was educated at the Royal High School, Edinburgh, the University of Edinburgh, and the Royal Military College, Sandhurst.

Smith was commissioned into the Essex Regiment in November 1891 and was posted to the 2nd Battalion, serving in Cyprus and then India, where he transferred to the Indian Staff Corps in January 1896 and served in the Tirah Campaign of 1897. He was promoted captain in October 1901. He joined the Indian Political Department in 1902 and served in the remote areas of Gilgit, Chilas, Chitral, and the Tochi, all in the Himalayas. He was promoted major in November 1909.

In the First World War, he served in the Indian Expeditionary Force in France and Flanders with Hodson's Horse, fighting at Mons. He later transferred to Fane's Horse, and also served as an intelligence officer.

Returning to India in 1917, he served as Political Officer at Gilgit until 1920, although also serving in the Third Afghan War in 1919. He was then appointed Political Agent at Quetta until his retirement in 1923.

Returning to the United Kingdom, he was appointed publicity secretary of the Public Schools Cadet Association in 1926 and secretary of the British National Cadet Association in 1931, holding both posts until his death.

He was appointed Companion of the Order of the Indian Empire (CIE) in the 1920 New Year Honours.
