= Price Commission =

Former UK government policy

The Price Commission was set up in the UK under the Counter-Inflation Act 1973, alongside the Pay Board, in an attempt to control inflation. The Conservative government of Edward Heath, elected at the 1970 general election, had previously abolished the Prices and Incomes Board in November 1970, shortly after taking power, relying on competition to keep prices down. At the same time, the Industrial Relations Act 1971 was intended to rein in the trades unions.

The Conservatives' economic policy was not successful, and the government took a U-turn. A 90-day freeze of pay and prices (as well as rents and dividends) was introduced on 6 November 1972 under the Counter-Inflation (Temporary Provisions) Act 1972. This was replaced by a Price and Pay Code, which strictly limited increases, supervised by a new Price Commission and a Pay Board.

The Conservatives were unable to keep power after the inconclusive February 1974 UK general election, and the Pay Board was abolished in July 1974 by the minority Labour government led by Harold Wilson, but the Price Commission continued. The scope of its powers were amended by the Price Commission Act 1977 and the Price Commission (Amendment) Act 1979.

Controls on prices were abolished soon after the Conservatives under Margaret Thatcher won the 1979 general election, and the Counter-Inflation Act 1973 was repealed by the Competition Act 1980.
