= George Smith (1833–1919) =

George Smith CIE FRGS LLD (28 April 1833 – 24 December 1919) was a 19th-century Scottish historian and geographer who spent his working life in India. He was father to a family of eminent figures.

== Life ==
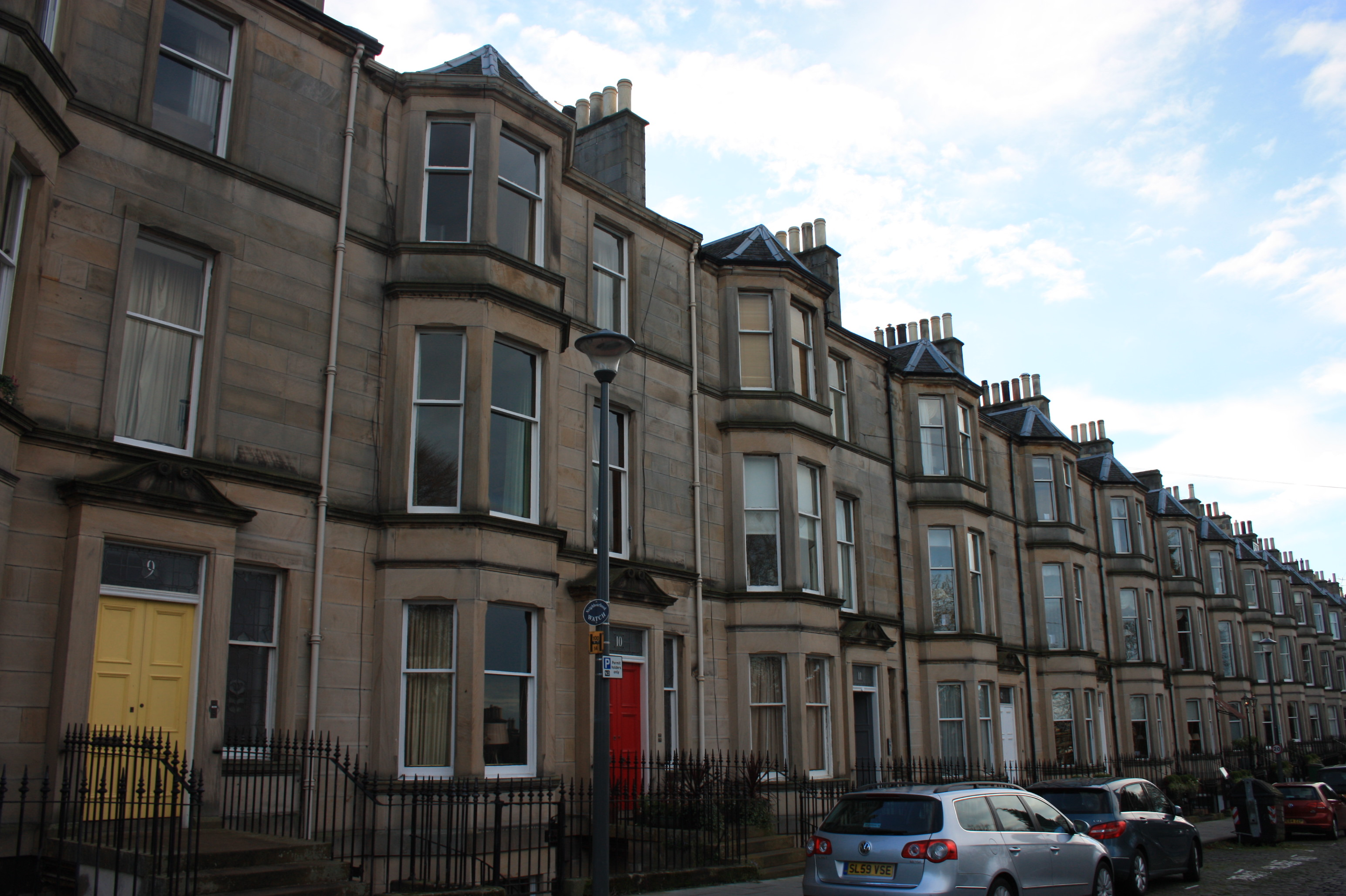
South Learmonth Gardens, Edinburgh (10 at red door)

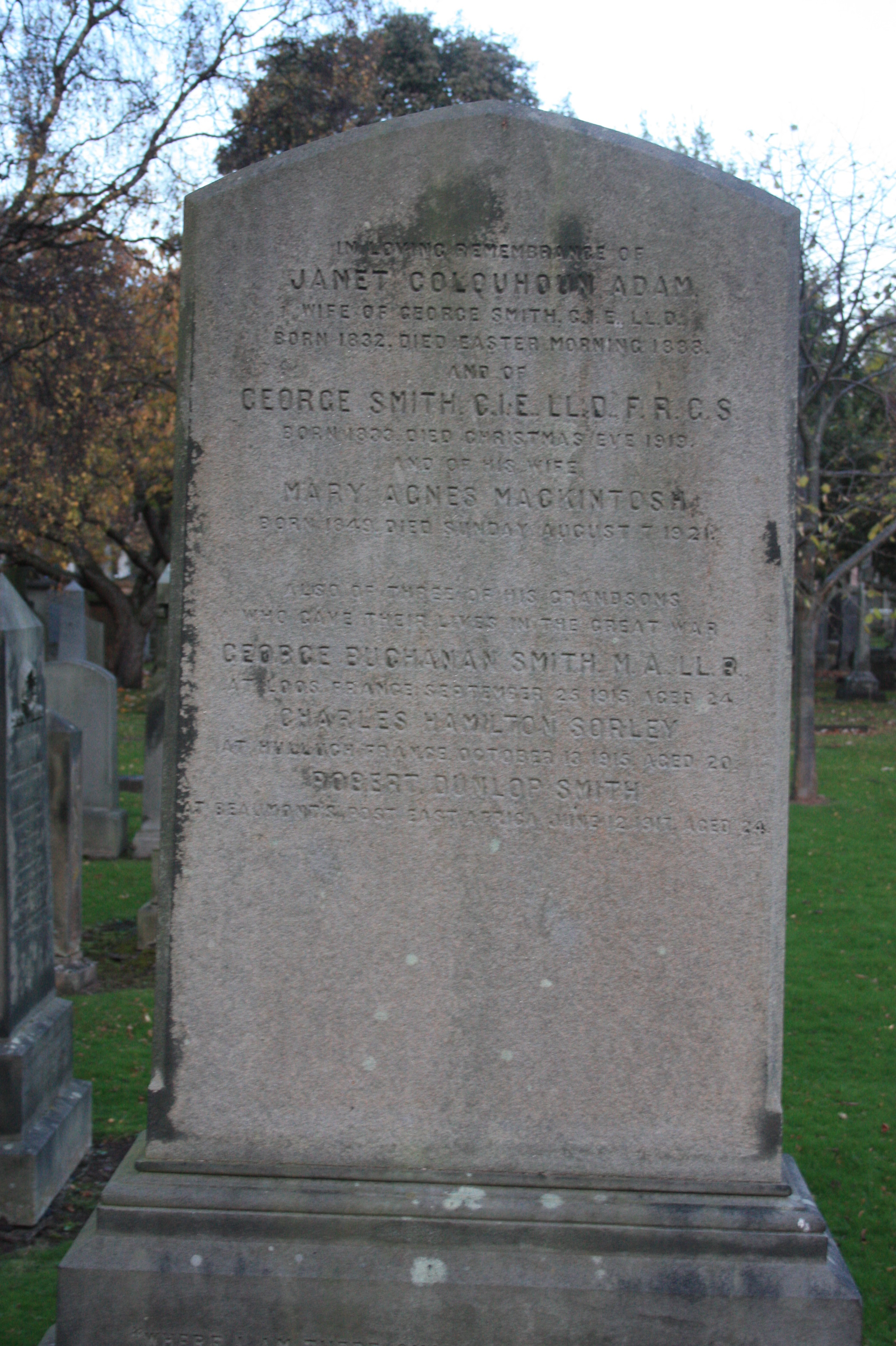
The grave of George Smith LLD, Grange Cemetery, Edinburgh

He was born in Leith on 28 April 1833 the son of Isabella Anderson, and her husband Adam Smith (1809–1837). His father died while he was a young child.

He was educated at the High School in Edinburgh then studied at the University of Edinburgh graduating around 1850. In 1855, he moved to Calcutta, in India, to act as the first Principal of the Doveton College, a boys' school in Madras. In 1856, aged 23, he became a Fellow of the University of Calcutta and also began to operate as their Examiner. From 1857, he was editor of the Calcutta Review. From 1860 he was the official Indian correspondent for The Times of London.

By the 1870s, Smith had returned to Scotland and was living at Scagrore House in Seafield, east of Leith. He was then editor of the journal, Friends of India. From 1878 he was Secretary of the Free Church of Scotland. In 1879 he became Vice President of the Royal Scottish Geographical Society

George Smith died at home, 10 South Learmonth Gardens, in the west of Edinburgh on Christmas Eve, 24 December 1919.

He is buried with his wives on the western path of Grange Cemetery in south Edinburgh. The grave lies on the edge of the north-west section.

== Publications ==
- The Life of John Wilson (1878)
- The Life of Alexander Duff (1879)
- Fifty Years of Foreign Missions (1880)
- The Geography of British India: Political & Physical, London: John Murray, 1882.
- A Student's Geography of India (1882)
- A Short History of Christian Missions (1884)
- The Life of William Carey (1885)
- A Modern Apostle: Alexander N Somerville (1890)
- Henry Martyn Saint and Scholar (1891)
- The Conversion of India from Pantaenus to the Present Time (1893)
- Bishop Heber Poet and Chief Missionary to the East (1895)
- Twelve Indian Statesmen (1897)
- Twelve Pioneer Missionaries (1900)

== Family ==
In 1855 Smith married, firstly, Janet Colquhoun Adam (1832–1888). Their children included the Very Rev Sir George Adam Smith, Sir James Dunlop Smith, Rev. Hunter Smith and Charles Aitchison Smith. His daughter Ann Gertrude Smith, married Sir Montagu Sherard Dawes Butler and they were parents to Rab Butler. Following Janet's death, he married, secondly, in 1890, Mary Agnes MacKintosh (1849–1921).

Three of Smith's grandsons died in World War I: George Buchanan Smith, Robert Dunlop Smith and Charles Hamilton Sorley.
